= Tangkak Bypass =

- Jalan Pintasan Tangkak 东甲绕道

Route information
- Maintained by Malaysian Public Works Department
- Length: 8.1 km (5.0 mi)
- Existed: 2022–present
- History: Will complete in February 2027
- Restrictions: 90 km/h (56 mph)

Major junctions
- Beltway around Tangkak
- Northeast end: Kampung Payamas
- FT 23 Federal Route 23; J187 State Route J187
- Southwest end: Tangkak Industrial Area

Location
- Country: Malaysia
- Primary destinations: Muar, Parit Bunga, Sungai Mati, Bukit Gambir, Bukit Kangkar, Tangkak, Sagil, Jementah, Gemereh, Segamat

Highway system
- Highways in Malaysia; Expressways; Federal; State

Tangkak Bypass (Malay: Jalan Pintasan Tangkak; Chinese: 东甲绕道) is a major highway bypass in Tangkak, a textile town in Johor, Malaysia. The 8.1-kilometre (5.0 mi) highway bypass linking Johor Matriculation College in the northeast to Tangkak Industrial Area (Phase 1) in the southwest.

== History ==
The construction of Tangkak Bypass is a part of Muar–Tangkak–Segamat Road upgrade package.

The Tangkak Bypass is expected to be completed in February 2027. The total costs of the constructions are RM 183.88 millions. Until December 2025, the construction progress is 66.19%.

== Features ==
The Tangkak Bypass comes with these features.

- 8.1 km (5.0 mi) four-lane dual carriageway
- Six traffic light intersections
- Four bridges
- Street lights

At most sections, the Tangkak Bypass was built under the JKR R5 road standard, allowing maximum speed limit of up to 90 kilometres per hour (56 mph).
