= Malaysia Federal Route 23 =

Road in Malaysia

Federal Route 23
- Jalan Muar–Tangkak–Segamat
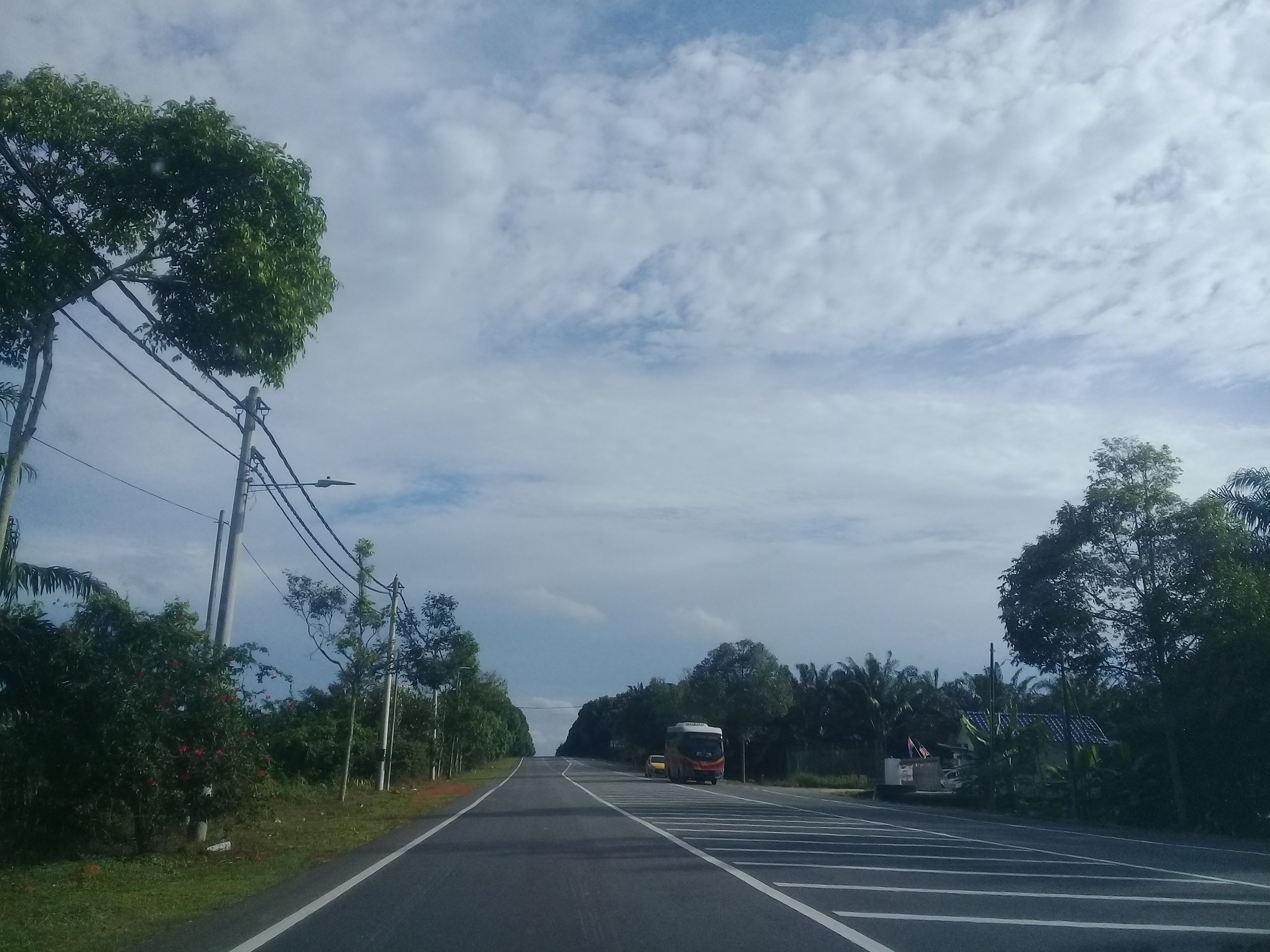

Route information
- Maintained by Malaysian Public Works Department
- Length: 76.27 km (47.39 mi)
- Existed: 1914–present
- History: Completed in 1939

Major junctions
- South end: Parit Bunga
- FT 224 Muar Bypass; FT 5 Federal Route 5 FT 5 / FT 19 AMJ Highway; J60 State Route J60; J33 State Route J33; J136 State Route J136; Tangkak Bypass; North–South Expressway Southern Route / AH2; J21 State Route J21; J187 State Route J187; J123 State Route J123; J138 State Route J138; J34 State Route J34; J277 State Route J277; J43 State Route J43; J153 State Route J153; J161 State Route J161; J39 State Route J39; J40 State Route J40 FT 1 / AH142 Federal Route 1 J154 State Route J154
- North end: Segamat

Location
- Country: Malaysia
- Primary destinations: Sungai Mati, Bukit Gambir, Bukit Kangkar, Tangkak, Sagil, Jementah, Gemereh

Highway system
- Highways in Malaysia; Expressways; Federal; State

Federal Route 23, or Jalan Muar–Tangkak–Segamat, is a federal road in Johor, Malaysia, connecting Segamat in the north and Parit Bunga in the south. It is also a main route to North–South Expressway Southern Route via Tangkak Interchange.

== Route background ==
The Kilometre Zero of the Federal Route 23 starts at Parit Bunga, at its interchange with the Federal Route 5, the main trunk road of the west coast of Peninsular Malaysia.

== History ==
In 1914, two roads Federal Route 1 and Federal Route 23 build for connecting between Segamat and main towns in Johor, which both roads completed in 1939. The land transportation mode become more frequently since it is more convenient, making rivering transportation mode is not using anymore. Pengkalan Esah now become place of Segamat Second Bridge J217.

Since Federal Route 23 opening in 1939, many improvements had made for FT23, many sharp corners in Kampung Lubuk Batu, Kampung Batu 7, and Kampung Bukit Tunggal are straightened. However, Federal Route 23 still well known with many sharp corners, especially the dead corners in Tangkak district are still not straighten until the upgrading of the Federal Route 23 from Segamat to Tangkak section. The Kampung Batu 7 old section formed the J43 Jalan Bypass and J264 Jalan Universiti.

In 1997, Minister of Works, Datuk Seri Samy Vellu, announced to build Segamat–Muar Expressway as the new expressway parallel with existed Federal Route 23. However, this project is canceled because of the 1997 Asian financial crisis. As the replacement, the upgrading of the roads from Segamat to Tangkak began in November 2011.

To reduce the congestion in Tangkak, Tangkak Bypass between Tangkak Industrial Area (Phase 1) and Johor Matriculation College is constructing to reduce the traffic flow in Tangkak and make traffic in Tangkak smoother.

=== Road closure for bridge rebuilt near the Mount Ledang junctions ===
The sections near the Mount Ledang junctions are restricted to under 36 tons to rebuild the Sungai Ayer Panas bridge. On 19 August 2020, the Bailey installation was completed and open for all types of vehicles; the weights are restricted to under 36,000 kg (79,000 lb).

On 9 March 2022, The Ministry of Works has allocated RM6.8 million to rebuild Sungai Ayer Panas bridge 16 kilometers between Tangkak and Segamat, which is expected to be completed in two years. The project scopes included built temporary roads, abolish the old bridge and build new bridge.

== Features ==
- Many Chinese cemeteries along the road between Bukit Kangkar and Tangkak
- A main route to Gunung Ledang
- Tangkak, a textile town of Johor

At most sections, the Federal Route 23 was built under the JKR R5 road standard, allowing maximum speed limit of up to 90 km/h (56 mph).

=== Speed limits ===
- Town area: 60 km/h (37 mph)
- Approaching any school/collage: 30 km/h (19 mph)
- Sagil–Sekolah Kebangsaan Puteri Ledang: 50 km/h (31 mph) (Dead accident area)

== Upgrading of the Federal Route 23 ==
On 7 December 2007, the federal government decided to upgrade the 40-km stretch from Segamat to Tangkak from a two-lane road to a four-lane road. The road was completed around 2015. Meanwhile the second section from Jementah to Just before the Gunung Ledang Resort Waterfall entrance was completed in December 2020.

=== Construction of the Segamat–Tangkak–Muar Highway ===
Construction of the 63-km Segamat–Tangkak–Muar Highway, estimated to cost between RM750 million and RM770 million, was to begin in November 2011. The road upgrading project will be carried out in five packages including an upgrading 14 bridges along the route. Package 1b and 2 of the highway were completed on 2015.

== Junction and town lists ==
The entire route is located in Johor.

Legend:

- I/C - Interchange, I/S - Intersection, RSA - Rest and service area, OBR - Overhead bridge restaurant, R/R - Restaurant and rest plaza, L/B - Layby, V/P - Vista point, TN - tunnel, T/P - Toll plaza, BR - Bridge
- C - Cloverleaf, S - Stack, T-A - Trumpet-A, T-B - Trumpet-B, DT - Directional-T/Y, SDT - Semi-Directional-T/Y, P-Y - Partial-Y, D - Diamond, P-C - Partial cloverleaf, D-D - Diverging diamond, D-R - Direct ramp

District	Subdistrict	Km	Exit	Name	Destinations	Notes
Tangkak	Tangkak	0.0	I/C	Parit Bunga	FT 5 Jalan Kesang – Tanjung Agas, Muar Town Centre (Royal Town); FT 224 Muar Bypass – Pagoh, Yong Peng, Batu Pahat; North–South Expressway Southern Route / AH2 – Johor Bahru, Singapore (through Pagoh); FT 5 / FT 19 AMJ Highway – Malacca, Merlimau, Jasin	Interchange
Tangkak	Tangkak			Parit Bunga; U-turn	U-turn	U-turn
Tangkak	Tangkak			Parit Bunga Mosque		
Tangkak	Tangkak			APAD	Land Public Transport Agency (APAD); Muar and Tangkak Branch Office	
Tangkak	Tangkak		BR	Parit Ponorogo bridge Parit Ponorogo	Parit Ponorogo	T-junctions
Tangkak	Tangkak			TNB's Sungai Mati Substations		
Tangkak	Tangkak		BR	Sendok River bridge		
Tangkak	Tangkak			Taman Ceria	Taman Ceria	T-junctions
Tangkak	Tangkak			Pekan Rawang	Jalan Pantai Layang – Kampung Pantai Layang	T-junctions
Tangkak	Tangkak			Jalan Kesang Tasik	J60 Jalan Kesang Tasik – Kesang Tasik, Sungai Rambai, Merlimau	T-junctions
Tangkak	Tangkak		BR	Parit Kesang Tasik bridge		
Tangkak	Tangkak			Sungai Mati-WCE	West Coast Expressway	Under planning
Tangkak	Tangkak		I/S	Sungai Mati	J33 Johor State Route J33 – Bukit Gambir, Bukit Serampang; North–South Expressway Southern Route / AH2 – Kuala Lumpur, Johor Bahru	Town junctions
Tangkak	Tangkak			Taman Bukit Kangkar	Taman Bukit Kangkar	T-junctions
Tangkak	Tangkak			Bukit Kangkar		
Tangkak	Tangkak			Jalan Teluk Rimba	J136 Jalan Teluk Rimba – Kampung Teluk Rimba	T-junctions
Tangkak	Tangkak			Serom Chinese Cemetery		
Tangkak	Tangkak			Kampung Batu 10 Serom	Kampung Batu 10 Serom	T-junctions
Tangkak	Tangkak			Serom Chinese Cemetery		
Tangkak	Tangkak			Serom Chinese Cemetery		
Tangkak	Tangkak			Tangkak Industrial Area (Phase 2)	Tangkak Industrial Area (Phase 2)	T-junctions
Tangkak	Tangkak			Tangkak Industrial Area (Phase 1)	Tangkak Industrial Area (Phase 1)	T-junctions
Tangkak	Tangkak			Tangkak Bypass	Tangkak Bypass – Sagil, Mount Ledang, Jementah, Segamat	Under construction
Tangkak	Tangkak			Tangkak-NSE	North–South Expressway Southern Route / AH2 – Kuala Lumpur, Seremban, Malacca, Jasin, Pagoh, Yong Peng, Johor Bahru, Singapore	T-junctions
Tangkak	Tangkak			PLUS PLUS Expressways section maintenances office PROPEL PROPEL section maintenances office		Services T-junctions
Tangkak	Tangkak			Jalan Sungai Tangkak	Jalan Sungai Tangkak	T-junctions
Tangkak	Tangkak		BR	Tangkak River bridge		
Tangkak	Tangkak			Tangkak		
Tangkak	Tangkak			Tangkak	J21 Jalan Sialang – Jasin, Chin Chin, Nyalas, Malacca; J187 Jalan Solok – Solok, Bukit Gambir	Junctions
Tangkak	Tangkak			Tangkak; Tangkak District Mosque	Tangkak District Mosque, Tangkak District and Land Office	
Tangkak	Tangkak			Tangkak		
Tangkak	Tangkak			Tangkak Cemetery		
Tangkak	Tangkak			Taman Payamas	Jalan Cenderawasih – Taman Payamas	T-junctions
Tangkak	Tangkak			Kampung Payamas	J123 Jalan Bekoh – Simpang Bekoh, Nyalas, Asahan	T-junctions
Tangkak	Tangkak			Johor Matriculation College	Johor Matriculation College	T-junctions
Tangkak	Tangkak			Tangkak Bypass	Tangkak Bypass – Bukit Kangar, Sungai Mati, Parit Bunga, Muar	Under construction
Tangkak	Tangkak	33.0		Sagil; Jalan Kampung Melayu Raya	J138 Jalan Kampung Melayu Raya – Kampung Sagil Parit 1, 2 and 3, Parit Hassan, Bukit Gambir	
Tangkak	Tangkak			Sagil		
Tangkak	Tangkak			Sagil; Mount Ledang	Gunung Ledang, Gunung Ledang waterfalls, Gunung Ledang Resort,	T-junctions
Tangkak	Tangkak		BR	Bridge		
Tangkak	Tangkak			Sagil	Jalan Ladang Sagil – Kampung Termil, Kampung Melepang, Kampung Hang Tuah	T-junctions
Tangkak	Tangkak			TNB High voltage lines	Dead accident area	Speed limit: 50 km/h
Tangkak	Tangkak		BR	Bridge		
Tangkak	Tangkak			SK Puteri Ledang	Sekolah Kebangsaan Puteri Ledang	T-junctions; Speed limit: 30 km/h
Tangkak	Tangkak		BR	Bridge		
Tangkak	Tangkak		BR	Ayer Panas River bridge		
Tangkak	Tangkak			Mount Ledang	Gunung Ledang, Gunung Ledang waterfalls, Gunung Ledang Resort,	T-junctions
Tangkak	Tangkak	Start/End of dual carriageway				
Tangkak	Tangkak			Teratai I/S	J34 Johor State Route J34 – FELDA Sri Ledang, Bukit Serampang, Kampung Teratai, Bukit Kepong, Labis	T-junctions
Tangkak	Tangkak			Kebun Baharu	Jalan 1 – Kampung Baru Kebun Baru	T-junctions
Segamat	Segamat			Seri Ledang National Service camp		LILO
Segamat	Segamat		BR	Legeh River bridge		
Segamat	Segamat			Tai Shan Dian (泰山殿)		
Segamat	Segamat			Kampung Paya Jakas		
Segamat	Segamat			Jementah	Jalan Nuri – Taman Damai; Jalan Cantik – Taman Pelangi	Junctions
Segamat	Segamat			Jementah Town Centre	J277 Jalan Asahan–Jementah – Asahan, Nyalas, Bukit Asahan, Kampung Relau, Ladang Welch; Jalan Padang – Kampung Baru Jementah	Junctions
Segamat	Segamat			Taman Dedap	Jalan Kampung Kubu Dedap – Kampung Kubu Dedap, Taman Dedap	T-junctions; Use old road
Segamat	Segamat		BR	Jementah River bridge		
Segamat	Segamat			TNB Jementah intake		
Segamat	Segamat			Kampung Sungai Siput	J162 Jalan Sungai Siput – Kampung Sungai Siput	LILO
Segamat	Segamat			Kampung Batu 11		
Segamat	Segamat		BR	Titi Akar River bridge		
Segamat	Segamat			Kampung Lubok Bandan		
Segamat	Segamat			Kampung Batu 10		
Segamat	Segamat			Tebing Tinggi I/S	J164 Jalan Tebing Tinggi – Bukit Tunggal, Tebing Tinggi, FELCRA Gugusan Tebing Tinggi	T-junctions
Segamat	Segamat		BR	Penarah River bridge		
Segamat	Segamat			Jalan Batu Enam	J43 Johor State Route J43 – Batu Anam, Gemas, Universiti Teknologi MARA (UiTM) Segamat Campus	T-junctions; Use old road
Segamat	Segamat			Jalan Batu Enam	J43 Johor State Route J43 – Batu Anam, Gemas, Universiti Teknologi MARA (UiTM) Segamat Campus	LILO; Segamat bound
Segamat	Segamat		BR	Muar River bridge		
Segamat	Segamat			U-Turn		U-Turn
Segamat	Segamat		BR	Batang Lesong River bridge		
Segamat	Segamat			Kampung Batang Lesong	Old Road – Kampung Batang Lesong	LILO
Segamat	Segamat		BR	Simpang River bridge		
Segamat	Segamat		BR	Bongor River bridge		
Segamat	Segamat			Kampung Batu Badak	J153 Johor State Route J153 – Buloh Kasap, Gemas, Seremban, Kuantan	T-junctions
Segamat	Segamat			Kampung Batu Badak	Jalan Kampung Batu Badak – Pogoh, Bukit Kepong, Muar, Labis	LILO; Tangkak bound
Segamat	Segamat			Gemereh	Persiaran 1 – Taman Bunga Raya; Jalan Mawar – Taman Gemereh	T-junctions and LILO
Segamat	Segamat			Kampung Gemereh; Jalan Gudang Garam	J161 Jalan Gudang Garam – Kampung Tanjung Sengkawang, Kampung Gudang Garam	T-junctions
Segamat	Segamat		BR	Gemereh River bridge		
Segamat	Segamat	Start/End of dual carriageway				
Segamat	Segamat			Jalan Mohammad	J39 Jalan Mohammad – Kampung Seberang Stesyen, Kampung Batu Hampar, Kampung Berata, Kampung Semak Rantau, Kampung Gudang Garam	T-junctions
Segamat	Segamat			Kampung Lubuk Batu	Makam Bendahara Tepok (Tomb of the last Bendahara of Melaka)	Historic site
Segamat	Segamat		BR	Lubuk Batu bridge		
Segamat	Segamat			Jalan Temenggong	J40 Jalan Temenggong – Kampung Seberang Stesyen, Kampung Batu Hampar, Kampung Berata, Kampung Semak Rantau, Kampung Gudang Garam	T-junctions
Segamat	Segamat		BR	Railway bridge		
Segamat	Segamat			Segamat; Jalan Station	Jalan Station – Segamat Terminal Station KTM ETS	Junctions
Segamat	Segamat		I/S	Segamat; Permaisuri I/S	FT 1 / AH142 Malaysia Federal Route 1 – Tampin, Gemas, Bandar Muadzam Shah, Gambang, Kuantan, Labis, Yong Peng, Johor Bahru; North–South Expressway Southern Route / AH2 – Ayer Hitam, Johor Bahru, Singapore; J154 Jalan Sultan – Segamat town centre, Kampung Tengah, Segamat Inner Ring Road	Junctions
