= Johor State Route J34 =

Road in Malaysia

Johor Route 34
- Jalan Durian Chondong (official); Jalan Bukit Serampang/Jalan Jementah–Bukit Kepong (unofficial)

Major junctions
- West end: Kebun Baru, Tangkak
- FT 23 Federal Route 23; J188 State Route J188; FT 1379 Federal Route 1379; J33 State Route J33; J32 State Route J32
- East end: Bukit Kepong, Muar

Location
- Country: Malaysia
- Primary destinations: FELDA Sri Ledang, Bukit Serampang, Gerisek, Bukit Gambir

Highway system
- Highways in Malaysia; Expressways; Federal; State

Johor State Route J34, Jalan Durian Chondong, Jalan Bukit Serampang and Jalan Jementah–Bukit Kepong, is a main state road in Johor, Malaysia.

== History ==
J34 Jalan Durian Chondong became one of the alternative route between Tangkak to Segamat to repair bridge in Malaysia Federal Route 23 coded FT023/038/10 near to the Mount Ledang junctions, alongside with J188 Jalan Kampung Teratai, J143 Jalan Sengkang and J33 Jalan Bukit Gambir.

== Junction lists ==
The entire route is located in Johor.

Legend:

- I/C - Interchange, I/S - Intersection, RSA - Rest and service area, OBR - Overhead bridge restaurant, R/R - Restaurant and rest plaza, L/B - Layby, V/P - Vista point, TN - tunnel, T/P - Toll plaza, BR - Bridge
- C - Cloverleaf, S - Stack, T-A - Trumpet-A, T-B - Trumpet-B, DT - Directional-T/Y, SDT - Semi-Directional-T/Y, P-Y - Partial-Y, D - Diamond, P-C - Partial cloverleaf, D-D - Diverging diamond, D-R - Direct ramp

| District | Location | km | mi | Name | Destinations | Notes |
|---|---|---|---|---|---|---|
| Tangkak | Kebun Baru | | | Kebun Baru | FT 23 Malaysia Federal Route 23 – Jementah, Segamat, Asahan, Gemas, Kuantan, Tangkak, Muar, Jasin, Malacca, Mount Ledang; North–South Expressway Southern Route / AH2 – Kuala Lumpur, Malacca City, Johor Bahru, Singapore | T-junctions |
| Tangkak | Kampung Teratai | | | Kampung Teratai | J188 Jalan Kampung Teratai – Kampung Teratai, Bukit Gambir | T-junctions |
| Tangkak | Bukit Serampang | | | Bukit Serampang | FT 1379 Malaysia Federal Route 1379 – FELDA Sri Ledang | T-junctions |
| Tangkak | Bukit Serampang | | | Bukit Serampang | J33 Johor State Route J33 – Gerisek, Bukit Gambir, Sungai Mati, Muar | T-junctions |
| Tangkak–Muar district border | | | | Sungai Muar bridge | | |
| Muar | Bukit Kepong | | | Bukit Kepong | J32 Johor State Route J32 – Bukit Kepong, Pagoh, Muar, Labis, Chaah, Paloh, Yong Peng; North–South Expressway Southern Route / AH2 – Kuala Lumpur, Malacca City, Johor Bahru, Singapore | T-junctions |
1.000 mi = 1.609 km; 1.000 km = 0.621 mi
