= Johor State Route J33 =

Road in Malaysia

Johor Route 33
- Jalan Bukit Gambir 武吉甘蜜路
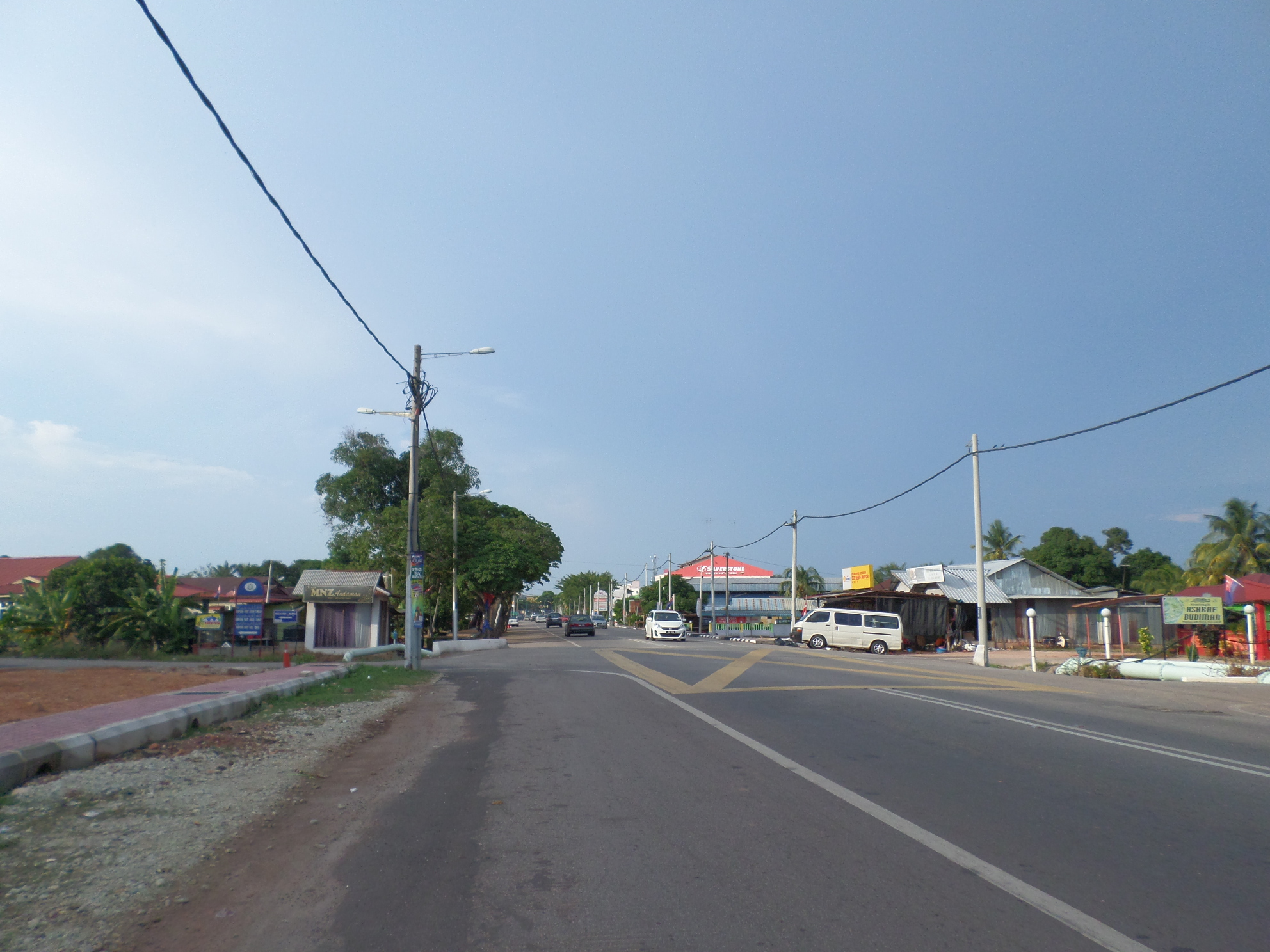

Route information
- Maintained by Malaysian Public Works Department
- Length: 44.0 km (27.3 mi)

Major junctions
- Southwest end: Sungai Mati
- FT 23 Federal Route 23; J187 State Route J187; North–South Expressway Southern Route / AH2; J194 State Route J194; J143 State Route J143; J137 State Route J137; FT 1378 Federal Route 1378; J34 State Route J34
- Northeast end: Bukit Serampang

Location
- Country: Malaysia
- Primary destinations: Serom, Gerisek, Panchor, Bukit Kepong

Highway system
- Highways in Malaysia; Expressways; Federal; State

Johor State Route J33, Jalan Bukit Gambir or Bukit Gambir Road (Chinese: 武吉甘蜜路) is a major road in Johor, Malaysia. The roads is also a main route to North–South Expressway Southern Route via Bukit Gambir Interchange.

== History ==
Upgrading and expansion projects for Sungai Mati–Sawah Ring Bridge and related road sections at State Route J33 started in March 2023, costed about RM9.4 million.

As of 15 December 2025, the progress is 82%.

As of 19 April 2026, the construction progress is 93% and expected completed in June 2026, the initial completion date is in earlier of 2026.

On 6 June 2026, the new Sawah Ring bridge expansion project is fully completed and opened for public usage.

== Features ==
- Many narrow bridges alongside the roads

== Junction lists ==
The entire route is located in Tangkak District, Johor.

Legend:

- I/C - Interchange, I/S - Intersection, RSA - Rest and service area, OBR - Overhead bridge restaurant, R/R - Restaurant and rest plaza, L/B - Layby, V/P - Vista point, TN - tunnel, T/P - Toll plaza, BR - Bridge
- C - Cloverleaf, S - Stack, T-A - Trumpet-A, T-B - Trumpet-B, DT - Directional-T/Y, SDT - Semi-Directional-T/Y, P-Y - Partial-Y, D - Diamond, P-C - Partial cloverleaf, D-D - Diverging diamond, D-R - Direct ramp

Location	km	mi	Name	Destinations	Notes
Sungai Mati	0.0	0.0	Sungai Mati	FT 23 Malaysia Federal Route 23 – Tangkak, Jementah, Segamat, Gunung Ledang, Muar, Malacca; North–South Expressway Southern Route / AH2 – Kuala Lumpur, Malacca, Johor Bahru, Singapore	Junctions
Serom			Serom	J187 Johor State Route J187 – Tangkak, Jasin, Malacca	T-junctions
Bukit Gambir			Bukit Gambir-NSE	North–South Expressway Southern Route / AH2 – Kuala Lumpur, Malacca, Tangkak, Pagoh, Yong Peng, Johor Bahru	T-junctions
Bukit Gambir			Jalan Parit Kasan	J194 Johor State Route J194 – Kampung Sagil Parit 1, 2 and 3, Parit Kasan, Sagil, Jementah, Segamat	
Bukit Gambir			Bukit Gambir	J143 Johor State Route J143 – Sengkang, Kampung Teratai, Jementah, Segamat; Jalan Perdagangan 4	Junctions
Bukit Gambir			Sawah Ring Bridge		
Gerisek			Jalan Panchor	J137 Johor State Route J137 – Panchor, Pagoh; North–South Expressway Southern Route / AH2 – Kuala Lumpur, Malacca, Johor Bahru, Singapore	T-junctions
Gerisek			Gerisek		
Bukit Serampang			Kundang Ulu	Unnamed Road – Kundang Ulu	
Bukit Serampang			Penchu	Unnamed Road – Penchu	
Bukit Serampang			FELDA Sri Jaya	FT 1378 Malaysia Federal Route 1378 – FELDA Sri Jaya	
Bukit Serampang			FELDA Bukit Serampang		
Bukit Serampang	44.0	27.3	Bukit Serampang	J34 Johor State Route J34 – Sagil, Jementah, Tangkak, Segamat, Bukit Kepong, Labis	T-junctions
1.000 mi = 1.609 km; 1.000 km = 0.621 mi: Unopened
