= Johor State Route J143 =

Road in Johor, Malaysia

Johor Route 143
- Jalan Sengkang 新港路

Major junctions
- Southwest end: Bukit Gambir
- J33 State Route J33; J188 State Route J188
- Northeast end: Kampung Teratai

Location
- Country: Malaysia
- Primary destinations: Sengkang

Highway system
- Highways in Malaysia; Expressways; Federal; State

Johor State Route J143, Jalan Sengkang or Jalan Kampung Lau Sik Kuai is a major road in Johor, Malaysia.

== Route description ==
The J143 Jalan Sengkang starts at Bukit Gambir and intersects with J33 Jalan Bukit Gambir. The Jalan Sengkang passes through the Sengkang New Village, which is the road name given. At Kampung Teratai, the state road intersects with single-lane sections of J188 Jalan Kampung Teratai, which forms the sharp T-junctions, and J143 continues as J188 to Kampung Teratai, Kebun Bharu and Jementah.

== History ==
J143 Jalan Sengkang became one of the alternative route between Tangkak to Segamat to repair bridge in Malaysia Federal Route 23 coded FT023/038/10 near to the Mount Ledang junctions.

On 1 June 2023, Toyota Corolla Altis and Toyota Hilux crashed at the Kampung Melepang Gantian from Sengkang to Kampung Teratai, the MCA Kampung Teratai Branch Treasurer and his family members, in total 4 people killed in the accident (3 died on-site, 1 died when the ceremony).

On 5 June 2023, remain one passenger in Toyota Corolla Altis passed away.

== Junction lists ==
The entire route is located in Tangkak District, Johor.

Location	km	mi	Name	Destinations	Notes
Bukit Gambir			Bukit Gambir	J33 Johor State Route J33 – Muar, Sungai Mati, Serom, Gerisek, Panchor, Tangkak; North–South Expressway Southern Route / AH2 – Kuala Lumpur, Malacca, Johor Bahru, Singapore; Jalan Perdagangan 4	Junctions
Bukit Gambir			Genuang River bridge		
Sengkang			Ayer Panas River bridge		
Sengkang			Sengkang Batu 18		
Sengkang			Kampung Kurnia Jaya	Jalan Kampung Kurnia Jaya	Village T-junctions
Sengkang			Sengkang	Sengkang Batu 19	
Sengkang			Sengkang Batu 20	Unnamed road – Kampung Hang Tuah, Kampung Seri Paya	T-junctions
Sengkang			Kampung Melepang Gantian	Dead accident area	Speed limit: 50 km/h (31 mph)
Kampung Teratai			Jalan Kampung Teratai	J188 Johor State Route J188 – Kampung Gek Kia, Bukit Serampang	Sharp T-junctions
Kampung Teratai			Through to J188 Johor State Route J188		
1.000 mi = 1.609 km; 1.000 km = 0.621 mi: Incomplete access; Route transition
