= Johor State Route J137 =

Road in Malaysia

Johor Route 137

Major junctions
- Northwest end: Gerisek
- J33 State Route J33; J139 State Route J139; J32 State Route J32
- Southeast end: Pagoh

Location
- Country: Malaysia
- Primary destinations: Panchor

Highway system
- Highways in Malaysia; Expressways; Federal; State

Jalan Panchor (Johor state route J137) is a major road in Johor, Malaysia.

== Junction lists ==
The entire route is located in Johor.

Legend:

- I/C - Interchange, I/S - Intersection, RSA - Rest and service area, OBR - Overhead bridge restaurant, R/R - Restaurant and rest plaza, L/B - Layby, V/P - Vista point, TN - tunnel, T/P - Toll plaza, BR - Bridge
- C - Cloverleaf, S - Stack, T-A - Trumpet-A, T-B - Trumpet-B, DT - Directional-T/Y, SDT - Semi-Directional-T/Y, P-Y - Partial-Y, D - Diamond, P-C - Partial cloverleaf, D-D - Diverging diamond, D-R - Direct ramp

District	Location	km	mi	Name	Destinations	Notes
Tangkak	Gerisek			Gerisek	J33 Johor State Route J33 – Sungai Mati, Muar, Tangkak, Gunung Ledang, Bukit Serampang, Sagil, Jementah, Segamat; North–South Expressway Southern Route / AH2 – Kuala Lumpur, Malacca	T-junctions
Tangkak–Muar district border				Sungai Muar bridge		
Muar	Panchor			Kampung Semaseh		
Muar	Panchor			Kampung Sri Tanjong		
Muar	Panchor			Kampung Melayu		
Muar	Panchor			Panchor		
Muar	Panchor			Panchor	J139 Johor State Route J139 – Kampung Raja, Makam Sultan Alauddin Riayat Syah I	T-junctions
Muar	Pagoh; Pagoh University Town			Pagoh; Bandar Universiti Pagoh		
Muar	Pagoh; Pagoh University Town			Parit Lundang Gajah		
Muar	Pagoh; Pagoh University Town			Pagoh; Bandar Universiti Pagoh	Pagoh University Town – International Islamic University Malaysia (IIUM) Southern Campus, Universiti Tun Hussein Onn Malaysia (UTHM) Pagoh Campus, Universiti Teknologi Malaysia (UTM) Research Centre, Politeknik Pagoh	Roundabout
Muar	Pagoh; Pagoh University Town			Pagoh; Bandar Universiti Pagoh	J32 Johor State Route J32 – Muar, Bukit Pasir, Pagoh, Lenga, Bukit Kepong, Labis, Parit Sulong, Dusun Damai; North–South Expressway Southern Route / AH2 – Johor Bahru, Singapore	T-junctions
1.000 mi = 1.609 km; 1.000 km = 0.621 mi
