= Johor State Route J43 =

Road in Malaysia

Johor Route 43
- Jalan Pulapol; Jalan Bypass

Major junctions
- Northeast end: Batu Anam
- FT 23 Federal Route 23; FT 1 Federal Route 1
- Southwest end: FT 23 Jalan Muar–Segamat

Location
- Country: Malaysia
- Primary destinations: Gemas, Tangkak, Jementah

Highway system
- Highways in Malaysia; Expressways; Federal; State

Jalan Pulapol, Jalan Bypass (Johor State Route J43) is a main state road in Johor, Malaysia. It is also a shortcut to Gemas.

== History ==
In 2016, the J43 Jalan Bypass had renamed to J43 Jalan Pulapol after the opening of the PULAPOL at this road.

== Junction lists ==
The entire route is located in Segamat District, Johor.

Legend:

- I/C - Interchange, I/S - Intersection, RSA - Rest and service area, OBR - Overhead bridge restaurant, R/R - Restaurant and rest plaza, L/B - Layby, V/P - Vista point, TN - tunnel, T/P - Toll plaza, BR - Bridge
- C - Cloverleaf, S - Stack, T-A - Trumpet-A, T-B - Trumpet-B, DT - Directional-T/Y, SDT - Semi-Directional-T/Y, P-Y - Partial-Y, D - Diamond, P-C - Partial cloverleaf, D-D - Diverging diamond, D-R - Direct ramp

Location	km	mi	Name	Destinations	Notes
Batu Anam			Batu Anam	FT 1 Malaysia Federal Route 1 – Tampin, Gemas, Batu Anam, Segamat, Labis, Johor Bahru, Kuantan	T-junctions
Batu Anam			Kampung Paya Lebar		
Jementah			Kampung Batu Tujuh	Universiti Teknologi MARA Segamat Campus	T-junctions
Jementah			Jalan Muar-Segamat	FT 23 Malaysia Federal Route 23 – Segamat, Jementah, Tangkak, Muar; North–South Expressway Southern Route / AH2 – Kuala Lumpur, Johor Bahru	T-junctions
1.000 mi = 1.609 km; 1.000 km = 0.621 mi
