= Johor State Route J153 =

Road in Malaysia

Johor Route 153

Route information
- Existed: 1967–present
- History: Completed in 1998

Major junctions
- Northeast end: Kampung Tandong, Buloh Kasap
- FT 23 Federal Route 23; FT 1 Federal Route 1
- Southwest end: Kampung Batu Badak

Location
- Country: Malaysia
- Primary destinations: Kampung Tasek Alai, Kampung Alai

Highway system
- Highways in Malaysia; Expressways; Federal; State

Jalan Tasek Alai, Johor State Route J153 is a main state road in Johor which is one of the 13 states in Malaysia. It acts as the main bypass of Segamat town centre for travelers from southwestern towns and cities such as Muar, Batu Pahat and Malacca City who travel to east coastal states via the Tun Razak Highway (Federal Route 12) and vice versa.

== Junction lists ==
The entire route is located in Segamat District, Johor.

Legend:

- I/C - Interchange, I/S - Intersection, RSA - Rest and service area, OBR - Overhead bridge restaurant, R/R - Restaurant and rest plaza, L/B - Layby, V/P - Vista point, TN - tunnel, T/P - Toll plaza, BR - Bridge
- C - Cloverleaf, S - Stack, T-A - Trumpet-A, T-B - Trumpet-B, DT - Directional-T/Y, SDT - Semi-Directional-T/Y, P-Y - Partial-Y, D - Diamond, P-C - Partial cloverleaf, D-D - Diverging diamond, D-R - Direct ramp

Location	km	mi	Name	Destinations	Notes
Buloh Kasap			Buloh Kasap I/S	FT 1 Malaysia Federal Route 1 – Seremban, Tampin, Gemas, Buloh Kasap, Segamat, Labis, Johor Bahru, Kuantan	T-junctions
Buloh Kasap			Railway crossing bridge		
Kampung Tandong			Kampung Tandong	Kampung Tandong	T-junctions
Kampung Alai			Kampung Alai	Kampung Alai	T-junctions
Kampung Batu Badak			Kampung Batu Badak	FT 23 Malaysia Federal Route 23 – Segamat, Labis, Johor Bahru, Jementah, Tangkak, Muar; North–South Expressway Southern Route / AH2 – Kuala Lumpur, Johor Bahru, Singapore	T-junctions
1.000 mi = 1.609 km; 1.000 km = 0.621 mi
