= Gunung Ledang National Park =

National park in Malaysia

- IUCN category Ia (strict nature reserve)
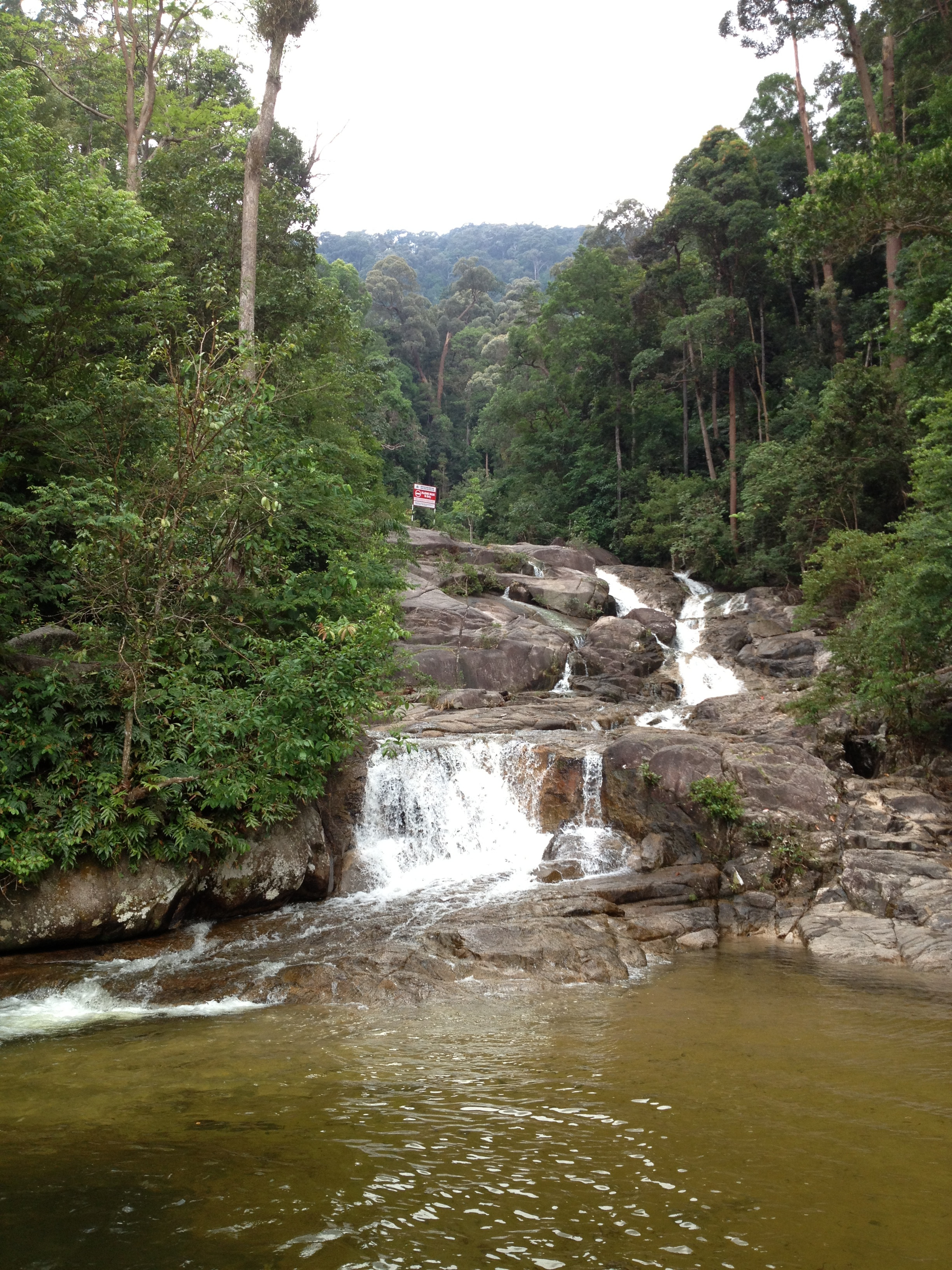
- Puteri Falls, Gunung Ledang N.P.

- Location within Malaysia
- Location: Malaysia
- Nearest city: Tangkak
- Coordinates: 2°22′N 102°36′E
- Area: 60 km^{2} (23 sq mi)
- Established: 2005

The Mount Ledang National Park (Malay: Taman Negara Gunung Ledang) is a national park located in Tangkak District, Johor, Malaysia. It contains the 1,276-metre tall Mount Ledang, Johor's tallest mountain. It was established in 2005, and is now one of the most famous hiking spots in the state.

Mount Ledang is additionally steeped in legend. Many of the legends are centered round the mythical princess, Puteri Gunung Ledang.

About 160 species of birds have been recorded in the park.

== See also ==
- List of national parks of Malaysia
