= Johor State Route J139 =

Road in Malaysia

Johor Route 139
- Jalan Kampung Raja
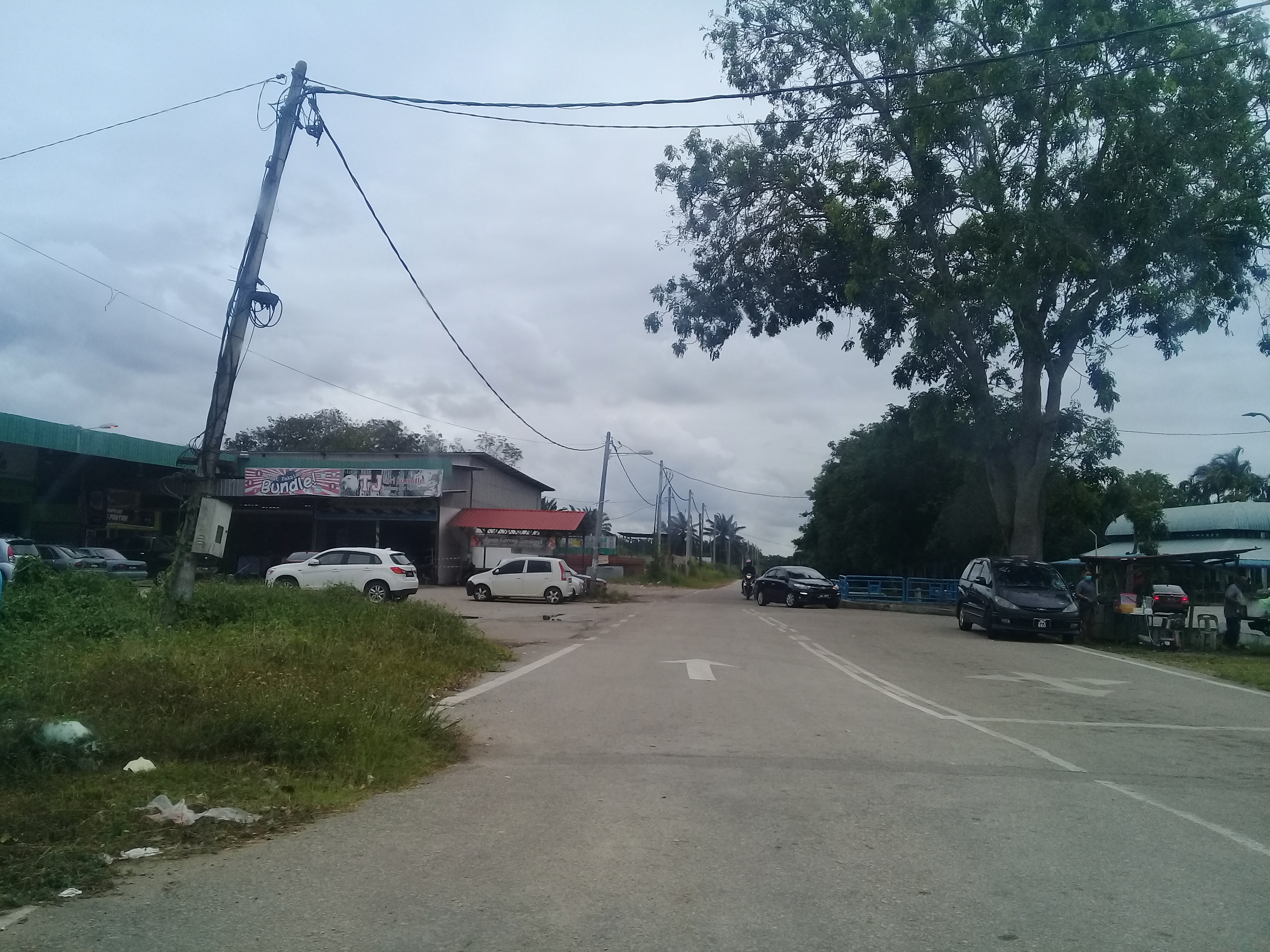

Major junctions
- Northwest end: Panchor
- J137 State Route J137; J32 State Route J32
- Southeast end: Pagoh

Location
- Country: Malaysia
- Primary destinations: Kampung Raja

Highway system
- Highways in Malaysia; Expressways; Federal; State

Johor State Route J139, Jalan Kampung Raja is a major road in Johor, Malaysia. It is also the main route to Kampung Raja.

== Features ==
- Kampung Raja, a historical area which happened war between Malacca Sultanate and Portugal colonial force
- Sultan Alauddin Riayat Syah I Mausoleum
- Kampung Brohol, the mausoleums of Malacca Sultanate Sultan/Bendehara
- Some road sections only allow one direction at the same time

== Junction lists ==
The entire route is located in Muar District, Johor.

Legend:

- I/C - Interchange, I/S - Intersection, RSA - Rest and service area, OBR - Overhead bridge restaurant, R/R - Restaurant and rest plaza, L/B - Layby, V/P - Vista point, TN - tunnel, T/P - Toll plaza, BR - Bridge
- C - Cloverleaf, S - Stack, T-A - Trumpet-A, T-B - Trumpet-B, DT - Directional-T/Y, SDT - Semi-Directional-T/Y, P-Y - Partial-Y, D - Diamond, P-C - Partial cloverleaf, D-D - Diverging diamond, D-R - Direct ramp

Km	Exit	Name	Destinations	Notes
	I/S	Panchor	J137 Johor State Route J137 – Bukit Gambir, Gerisek, Muar; North–South Expressway Southern Route / AH2 – Kuala Lumpur, Malacca, Johor Bahru, Singapore	T-junctions
		Kampung Berohol		
		Kampung Kelompang	Jalan Kampung Gelam – Kampung Gelam, Kampung Semeriot	T-junctions
		Kampung Raja	Kampung Raja Mosque, Sultan Alauddin Riayat Syah I Mausoleum	
		Kampung Olak Sepam		
	BR	Sungai Olak Sepam bridge		
		Kampung Paya Pagoh		
		Kampung Selancar		
	I/S	Pagoh	J32 Johor State Route J32 – Muar, Bukit Pasir, Pagoh, Lenga, Bukit Kepong, Labis, Dusun Damai, Parit Sulong; North–South Expressway Southern Route / AH2 – Kuala Lumpur, Malacca, Johor Bahru, Singapore; Jalan Gelam – Kampung Sari Baharu	Junctions
