= J34 =

J34 may refer to:

- Hawker J 34 Hunter, a British fighter jet in service with the Swedish Air Force
- LNER Class J34, a British steam locomotive class
- Jalan Bukit Serampang, Johor State Route J34
- Pentagonal orthobirotunda (J_{34}), a Johnson solid
- Westinghouse J34, an American turbojet engine
