= Tanjung Agas =

Town in Tangkak, Malaysia

- Town in Malaysia
- Sri Lambak in Johor, Malay Peninsular and Malaysia Tanjung Agas (Peninsular Malaysia) Tanjung Agas (Malaysia)
- Coordinates: 2°3′29.52″N 102°33′54″E
- Country: Malaysia
- State: Johor
- District: Tangkak
- Time zone: UTC+8 (MYT)
- Postal code: 84000

Tanjung Agas is a small town in Tangkak District, Johor, Malaysia. It is located on the north bank of the Muar River and on the intersection between the roads to Malacca and Tangkak. It also located 1 km from Muar town.
