= Tangkak =

- Town and district capital
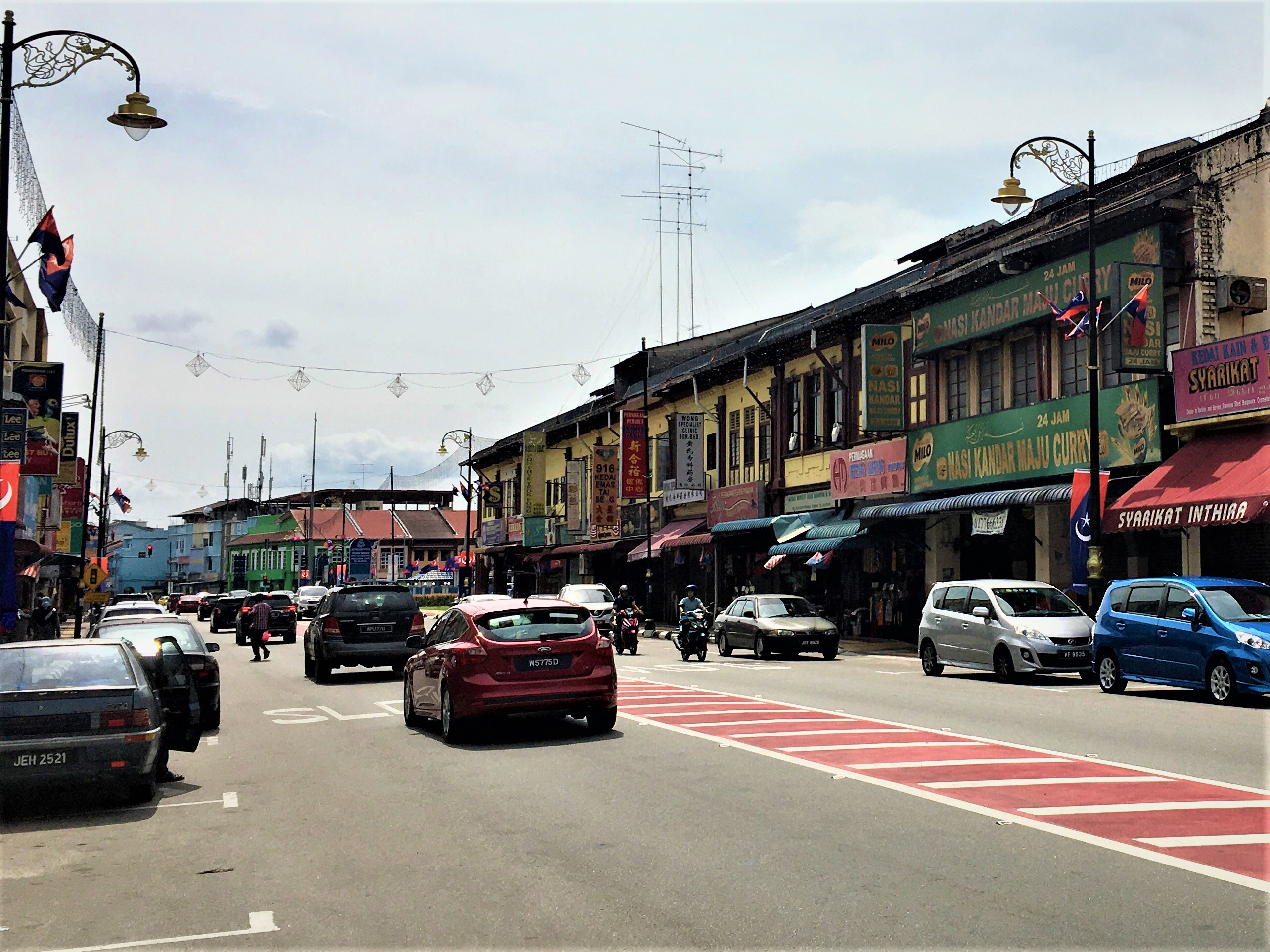
- Federal Route 23, downtown Tangkak

- Coat of arms
- Motto: Berusaha Untuk Makmur "Strive To Prosper" (motto of Tangkak District Council)
- Location within Johor Location within Malaysia Location within Southeast Asia
- Coordinates: 2°16′N 102°32′E
- Country: Malaysia
- State: Johor
- District: Tangkak
- Township: 1976

Government
  - Type: Local government
  - Body: Tangkak District Council
  - President: Shamsul Ariff Sulaiman (Since 16 October 2025)

Area
  - Total: 381.2 km^{2} (147.18 sq mi)

Population (2015)
  - Total: 52,014
  - Density: 136.45/km^{2} (353.40/sq mi)
- Time zone: UTC+8 (MST)
  - Summer (DST): Not observed
- Postal code: 84xxx
- National calling code: +6-07, +6-06
- License plate prefix: Jxx
- Website: www.mdtangkak.gov.my

Tangkak District Council Majlis Daerah Tangkak
- Emblem

Type
- Type: Local authority of Tangkak

History
- Founded: 1 August 1976
- Preceded by: Muar North District Council

Leadership
- President: Shamsul Ariff Sulaiman (since 16 October 2025)
- Secretary: Fakhruddin Shariff (since 1 October 2024)

Structure
- Seats: 24
- Political groups: Councillors: BN (24): UMNO (14); MCA (8); MIC (2)
- Length of term: 1 April 2024–31 December 2025

Motto
- Berusaha Untuk Makmur (Strive To Prosper)

Meeting place
- Pejabat Besar Majlis Daerah Tangkak, 84900 Tangkak, Johor Darul Ta'zim.

Website
- www.mdtangkak.gov.my

Tangkak is a town and the capital of Tangkak District in Johor, Malaysia. The town is nicknamed "Fabric Town" or "Syurga Kain" in honour of its many textile shops. It is also well known as being a major entry point to Mount Ledang, the highest mountain in Johor.

== Toponymy ==
According to hearsay, the name Tangkak came from the Malay verb merangkak, meaning "to crawl". It was believed that Long Mahmud had led seven brothers from Riau (in present day Indonesia) to start the first settlement that is today Tangkak. They had sailed from Riau and sailing along the Kesang River before finally arriving at Tangkak River. They saw the flat terrain and decided to stay put at the place. Unfortunately, they faced difficulties in getting up the river bank as their legs got caked in the slippery river mud. They had to use the roots of trees to help them to get themselves out. When other settlers asked them the name of the place, they will answer "tang merangkak tu". Over a period of time, it was shortened to Tangkak.

== History ==
Tangkak Town (Bandar Tangkak) in Tangkak District

Tangkak was founded in the year 1901 at the foot of Mount Ledang, and was previously under the direct control of Muar District. In 1946, the local council was established and was governed by the Assistant District Officer who in turn reported to the Muar District Office in those days.

Prior to 2008, the larger Muar District encompasses the sub-districts of Tangkak and Muar; referred as Muar Utara ("North Muar") and Muar Selatan ("South Muar"), respectively. The Tangkak district was the northern part of Muar District, which was separated from the southern half by the Muar River. In 2006, both were administratively divided and Tangkak was upgraded to a full-fledged district, and it was initially named as the Ledang district after the Mount Ledang nearby. By the end of 2015, the district was renamed as Tangkak by the decree of the Sultan of Johor, Sultan Ibrahim ibni Almarhum Sultan Iskandar, to preserve the historical value of traditional name of places in the state.

The Tangkak District covers Tangkak town, Tanjung Agas, Kesang, Sungai Mati, Serom, Sagil and Bukit Gambir.

== Government and politics ==
Tangkak (N10) has its own constituency in the Johor State Legislative Assembly. The seat is currently held by Ee Chin Li of the Democratic Action Party (DAP) from Pakatan Harapan (PH) ruling coalition.

At the national level, Tangkak under the parliamentary constituency of Ledang, currently held by Syed Ibrahim Syed Nor of People's Justice Party (PKR) from PH too, the federal ruling coalition.

Tangkak District Council (Malay: Majlis Daerah Tangkak) is the local government of Tangkak District including Tangkak town itself. It was formed on 1 August 1976 as the Muar North District Council (Malay: Majlis Daerah Muar Utara) through the merger of the nine local councils (Malay: Majlis Tempatan) of Tangkak, Kebun Bahru, Sagil, Bukit Kangkar, Sungai Mati, Serom, Bukit Gambir, Grisek dan Kundang Ulu and got its present name on 1 April 2001. On 1 January 2009, the Kesang Mukim was ceded from Muar District and became part of the Tangkak District Council and also Tangkak District administration area.

=== Departments ===
- Management Services (Khidmat Pengurusan)
- Finance (Kewangan)
- Valuation & Property Management (Penilaian Dan Pengurusan Harta)
- Engineering (Kejuruteraan)
- Urbanisation & Public Health (Perbandaran Dan Kesihatan Awam)
- Urban Planning & Landscape (Perancangan Bandar Dan Landskap)
- Community Development (Pembangunan Masyarakat)
- Licensing & Enforcement (Pelesenan Dan Penguatkuasaan)

=== Units ===
- Internal Audit (Audit Dalam)
- Law (Undang-undang)
- Corporate and Public Relations (Korporat dan Perhubungan Awam)
- One Stop Centre (Pusat Sehenti)

=== Administration areas (zones) ===
As of 2025, Tangkak is divided into 24 zones represented by 24 councillors to act as mediators between residents and the district council. The councillors for the 1 April 2024 to 31 December 2025 session are as below:

Zone	Councillor	Political affiliation
Bandar Tangkak Timur	Ong Chee Siang	MCA
Bandar Tangkak Barat	Mohamad Miskal	UMNO
Bandar Tangkak Utara	Yong Chew Seaw	MCA
Bandar Tangkak Selatan	Ravinthiran S Sinnasmooto	MIC
Bandar Tangkak	Panersilvam Muniady	MIC
Tangkak Jaya	Kamarul Ariffin Mohamed	UMNO
Bandar Baru Tangkak	Arufudin Wagiman	UMNO
Pengkalan Besar	Helmi Afendy Sahat@Ismail	UMNO
Bukit Kangkar	Mohd Fadli Saat	UMNO
Sungai Mati	Juariah Sareh	UMNO
Rawang	Nadhirah Afiqah Abdul Rahim	UMNO
Kesang	Abdul Ghafar Md Shah	UMNO
Tanjung Agas Utara	Abdul Rahim Taib	UMNO
Tanjung Agas Selatan	Norizan Mahat	UMNO
Serom A1	Kow Kok Yang	MCA
Serom A2	Lee Chai Ling	MCA
Bukit Gambir Barat	Mohd Salman Selamat	UMNO
Bukit Gambir Timur	Cha Jia Sheng	MCA
Bukit Gambir Utara	Zainal Kahar	UMNO
Bandar Sagil	Ong Wen Chieng	MCA
Grisek A1	Mohd Fauzi Abdullah	UMNO
Grisek A2	Rahmat Ahmad	UMNO
Kundang Ulu	Low Ping Jie	MCA
Kebun Bahru	Lim See Eng	MCA

== Transportation ==
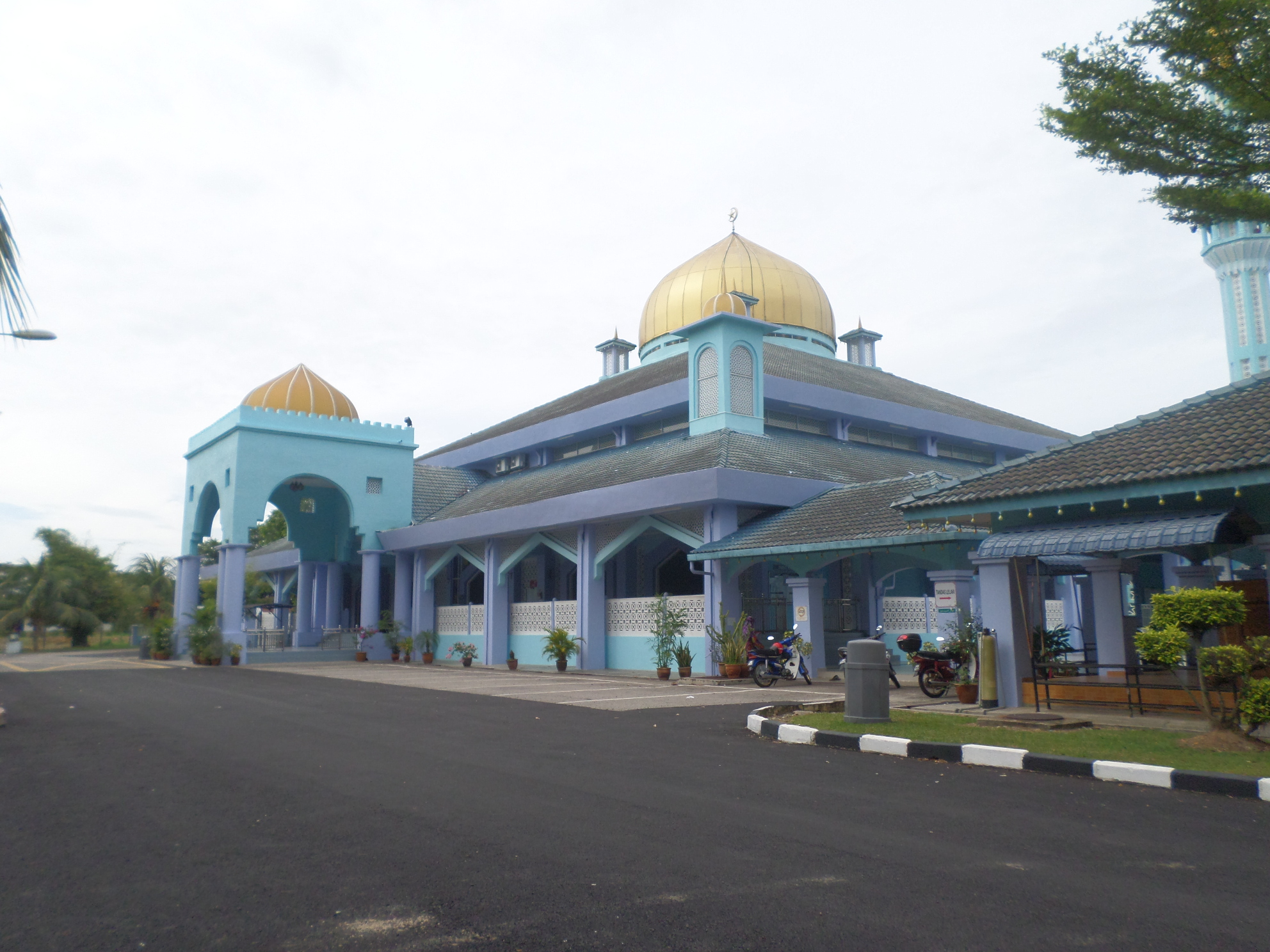
Masjid Jamek Tangkak

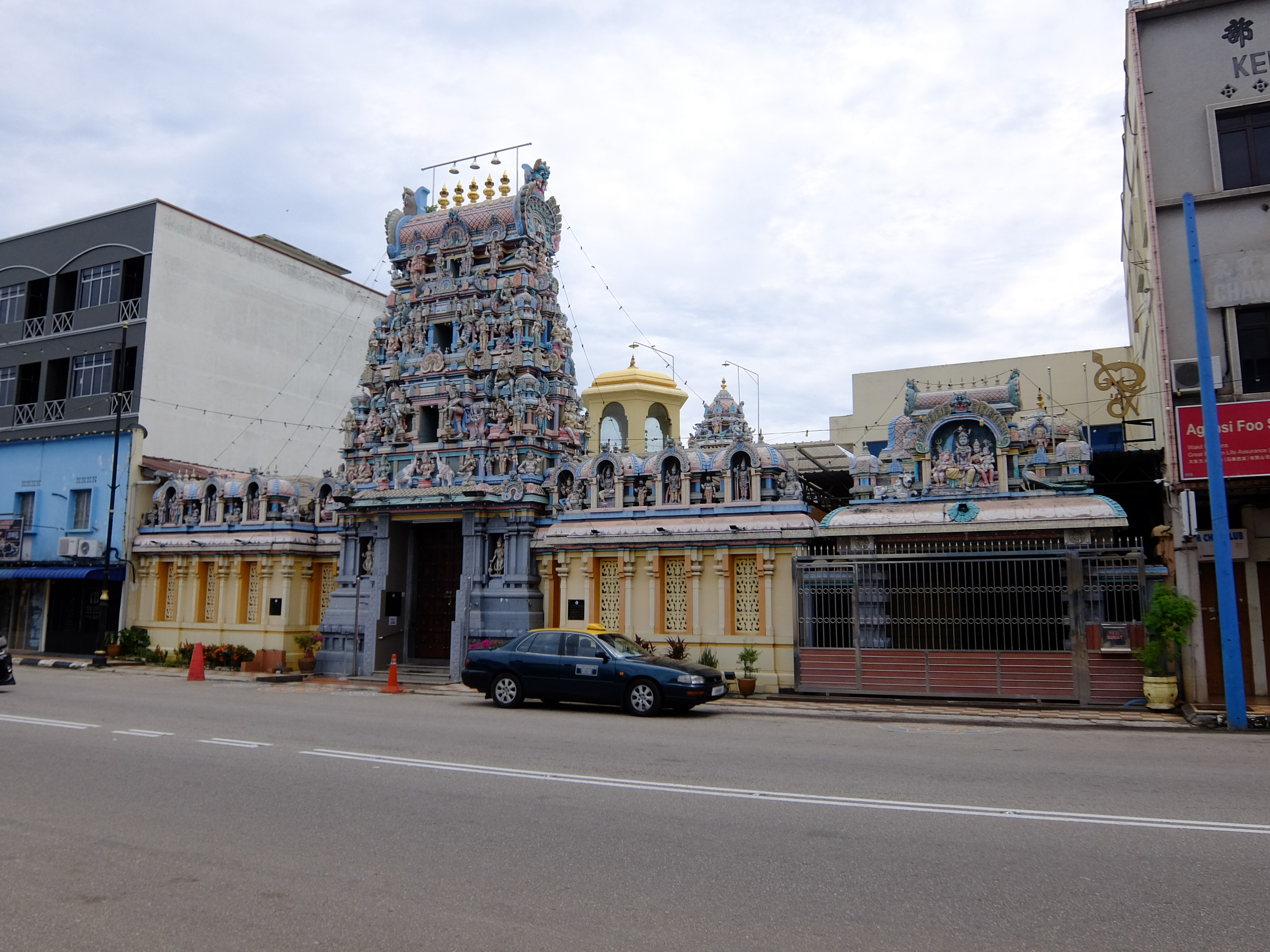
Sri Subramaniar Tangkak Temple

=== Car ===
Tangkak has an extensive network of roads including proximity to the North–South Expressway. Federal Route 23 links Tangkak to Muar in the south and Segamat in the north.

== Education ==
- Johor Matriculation College (KMJ)
- Ledang Vocational College
- SMK Sagil Tangkak
- SMK Ledang
- SMK Sri Tangkak
- SMK Tun Mamat
- SJK (C) Chi Ming 1
- SJK (C) Chi Ming 2
