= Parit Bunga =

Town in Johor, Malaysia

- Town in Malaysia

Other transcription(s)
  - Jawi: ڤاريت بوڠا
  - Chinese: 巴力文莪
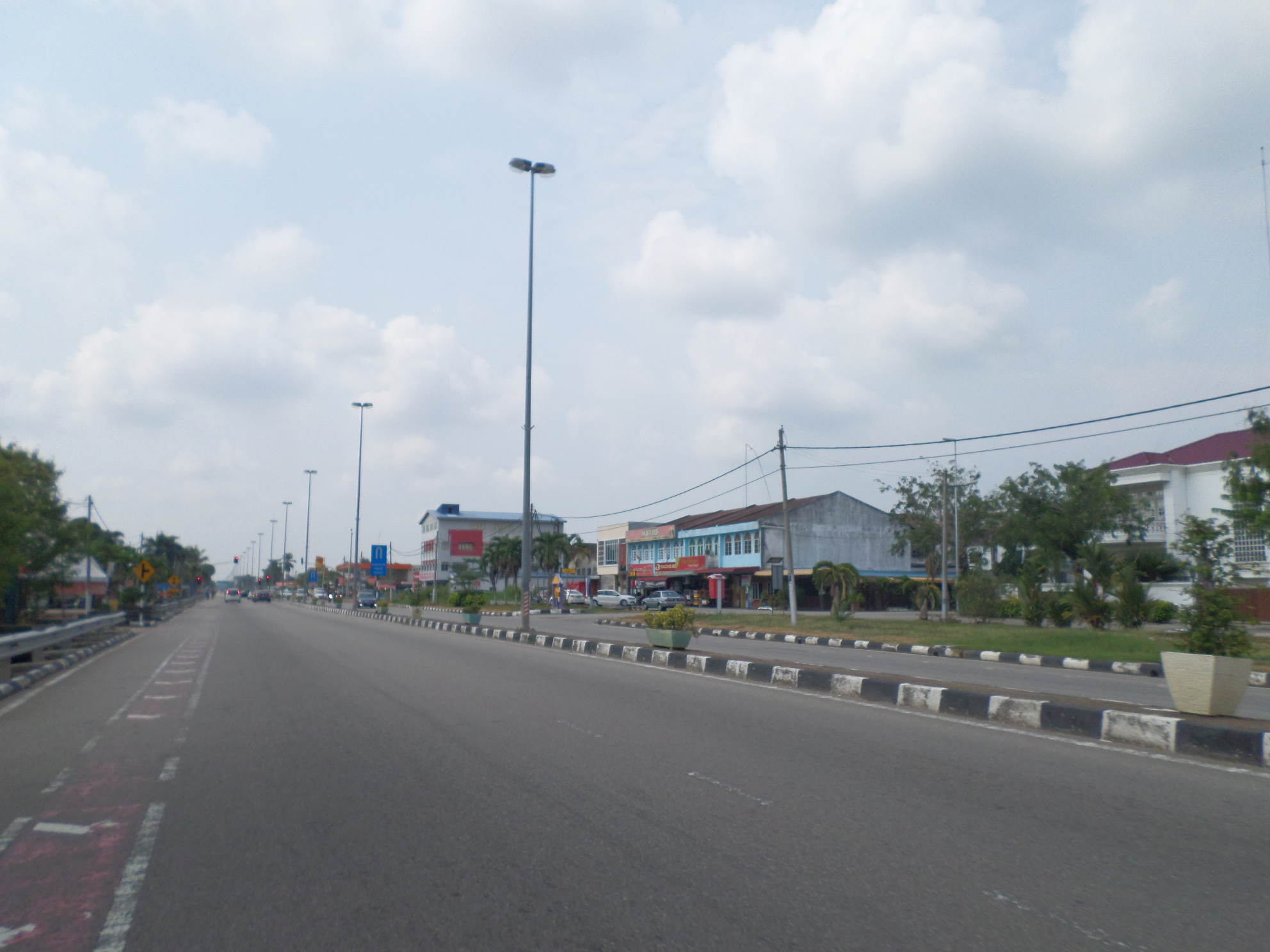
- Parit Bunga

- Parit Bunga in Johor, Malay Peninsular and Malaysia Parit Bunga (Peninsular Malaysia) Parit Bunga (Malaysia)
- Coordinates: 2.09911°N 102.55396°E
- Country: Malaysia
- State: Johor
- District: Tangkak
- Mukim: Mukim
- Elevation: 7 m (23 ft)
- Time zone: UTC+8 (MYT)
- Postal code: 84400

Parit Bunga in Tangkak District

Parit Bunga (Jawi: ڤاريت بوڠا; Chinese: 巴力文莪) is a small town in Mukim Kesang, Tangkak District, Johor, Malaysia. It is located on the Muar River and on the intersection between the roads to Malacca and Tangkak.
