= Ee Chin Li =

Malaysian politician

Yang Berhormat Tuan Ee Chin Li MLA
- 黄俊历

Member of the Johor State Legislative Assembly for Tangkak
- In office 5 May 2013 – 11 July 2026
- Preceded by: Goh Tee Tee (BN–MCA)
- Succeeded by: Haw Chin Teck (BN–MCA)
- Majority: 1,537 (2013); 5,077 (2018); 372 (2022)

Personal details
- Born: Ee Chin Li; 29 March 1982 (age 44) Tangkak, Johor, Malaysia
- Citizenship: Malaysian
- Party: Democratic Action Party (DAP)
- Other political affiliations: Pakatan Rakyat (PR) (2008–2015); Pakatan Harapan (PH) (since 2015)
- Spouse: Cher Ye Ching
- Children: Ee De Hui
- Occupation: Politician

Ee Chin Li (Chinese: 黄俊历; born 29 March 1982) is a Malaysian politician who served as Member of the Johor State Legislative Assembly (MLA) for Tangkak from May 2013 to July 2026. He is a member of the Democratic Action Party (DAP), a component party of the Pakatan Harapan (PH) and formerly Pakatan Rakyat (PR) coalitions.

== Politics ==
He was the Assistant treasurer of DAPSY Johor in 2011, Assistant Organising Secretary of DAPSY Johor in 2013, Treasurer of DAPSY Johor in 2015, Leader of DAPSY Johor in 2015, Treasurer of DAP Johor in 2018. He was also the Political Secretary for former Minister of Science, Technology and Innovation of Malaysia, Yeo Bee Yin from 2018 till the collapse of Pakatan Harapan government.

== Election results ==
Johor State Legislative Assembly
Year	Constituency	Candidate	Votes	Pct	Opponent(s)	Votes	Pct	Ballots cast	Majority	Turnout
2013	N10 Tangkak	Ee Chin Li (DAP)	10,729	52.64%	Goh Tee Tee (MCA)	9,192	45.10%	20,381	1,537	87.10%
2018	N10 Tangkak	Ee Chin Li (DAP)	13,512	59.83%	Goh Tee Tee (MCA)	8,435	37.35%	22,583	5,077	85.69%
2022	N10 Tangkak	Ee Chin Li (DAP)	8,105	40.03%	Ong Chee Siang (MCA)	7,733	38.19%	20,247	372	56.95%
2022	N10 Tangkak	Ee Chin Li (DAP)	8,105	40.03%	Chong Fat Full (BERSATU)	3,092	15.27%	20,247	372	56.95%
2022	N10 Tangkak	Ee Chin Li (DAP)	8,105	40.03%	Muhd Airel Zabridin (PEJUANG)	789	3.90%	20,247	372	56.95%
2022	N10 Tangkak	Ee Chin Li (DAP)	8,105	40.03%	Zainal Baharom A Kadir (IND)	121	0.60%	20,247	372	56.95%
2026	N10 Tangkak	Ee Chin Li (DAP)	10,828	43.59%	Haw Chin Teck (MCA)	14,010	56.41%	24,838	3,182	67.21%
