= Johor Matriculation College =

College in Tangkak, Johor, Malaysia

- Kolej Matrikulasi Johor (KMJ)
- Type: Kolej Matrikulasi Johor
- Affiliations: Majlis Amanah Rakyat (MARA)
- Location: Tangkak; 2°17′N 102°36′E
- Campus: Tangkak, Johor
- Website: www.kmj.matrik.edu.my
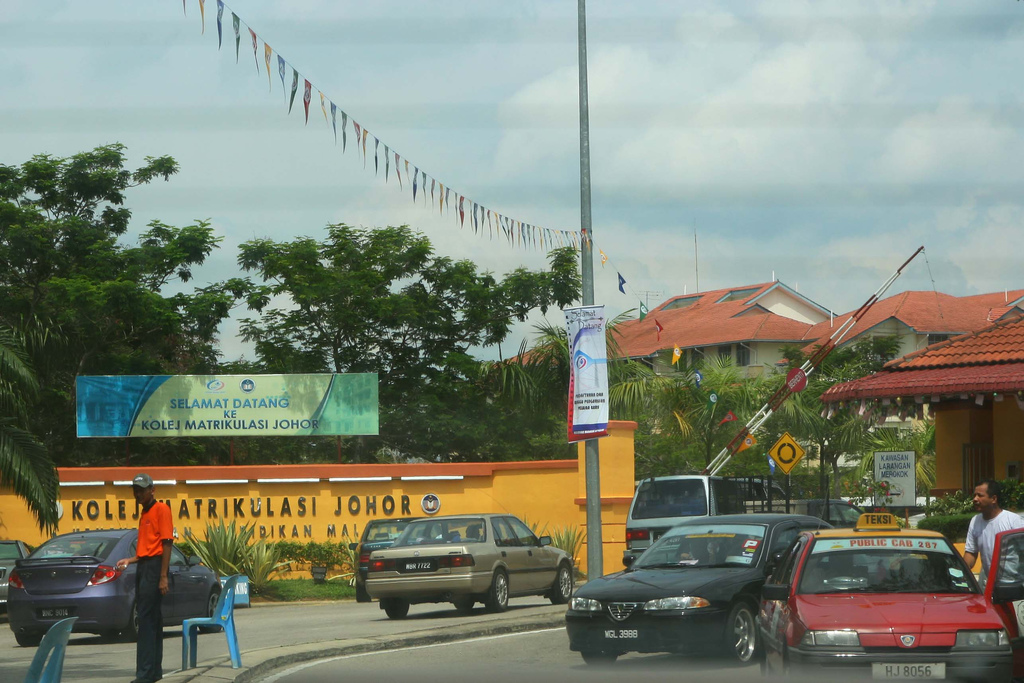

Johor Matriculation College (Malay: Kolej Matrikulasi Johor) (KMJ) is a pre-university tertiary education college under Matriculation Division, Ministry of Education (MOE) (Malay: Bahagian Matrikulasi, Kementerian Pendidikan Malaysia) in preparing students for the entrance of university. The college was established in March 2002. Its campus is located in Tangkak District, Johor.

== The Infrastructures ==

=== Student Dormitories ===
There are six student dormitories; two for boys and four for girls. Block A is known as Al-Zahrawi, while Block B is known as Al-Kindi. Both of the blocks are dedicated to boys studying in the junior college. Block C is known as Al-Jazari. Block D is known as Al-Razi. Block E is known as Al-Biruni. Block F is known as Al-Khawarizmi.

=== Libraries ===
Also known as Pusat Sumber Zaaba. The infrastructure is located in the middle of the college. Next to the library is the JPP Action Room. The Language Lab is also in the Library. There are a total of 3 Discussion Rooms; A, B and Relaxation Room. On the top level of the library, there is a computer lab with free Wi-Fi provided for the students. It is also known as the Teenagers' Cyber Room.

=== Tutorial Classrooms and Science Laboratories ===
Tutorial blocks are located beside the library near the examination block. The block housing the tutorial rooms has three levels with an average of 16 tutorial rooms per level. The ground floor has 7 Chemistry labs, the first floor has 5 Biology labs and the second floor has 7 Physics labs.

=== Lecturer Halls (DKB 1 and DKB 2, DKK 1–4) ===
There are a total of six lecture halls. DKB (Dewan Kuliah Besar (English: Large Lecture Hall)) 1 and 2 are special such that the designs are specially made. DKB 1 uses red chairs equipped with separate tables. DKB 2 consists of slanted tables with chairs specially built for each individual.

DKK (Dewan Kuliah Kecil (English: Small Lecture Hall)) 1, 2, 3 and 4 have the same structure. Chairs are fused to the table.

=== Office ===
This is also known as the Admin Block, built near the Lecturers' Café. Consisting of One Stop Centre for the usage of students to revise and study, the block has three levels. The ground floor consists of Dewan Sri Temenggung in which certain campaigns and activities are usually held (capacity of 200 individuals) and is equipped with a passage to a hidden toilet also linked to the Counselling Room. The third floor consists of Scientific subjects, while the second floor of other subjects, including Mathematics.

== Programme ==
As KMJ is under administration of the Matriculation Division, Ministry of Education, it will follow all the programmes arranged by the division.

=== One-year Programme ===
The One-Year Programme (Program Satu Tahun), or PST, is the main programme offered by the matriculation college. Students of this programme are often first intakes.
