= Kebun Bahru =

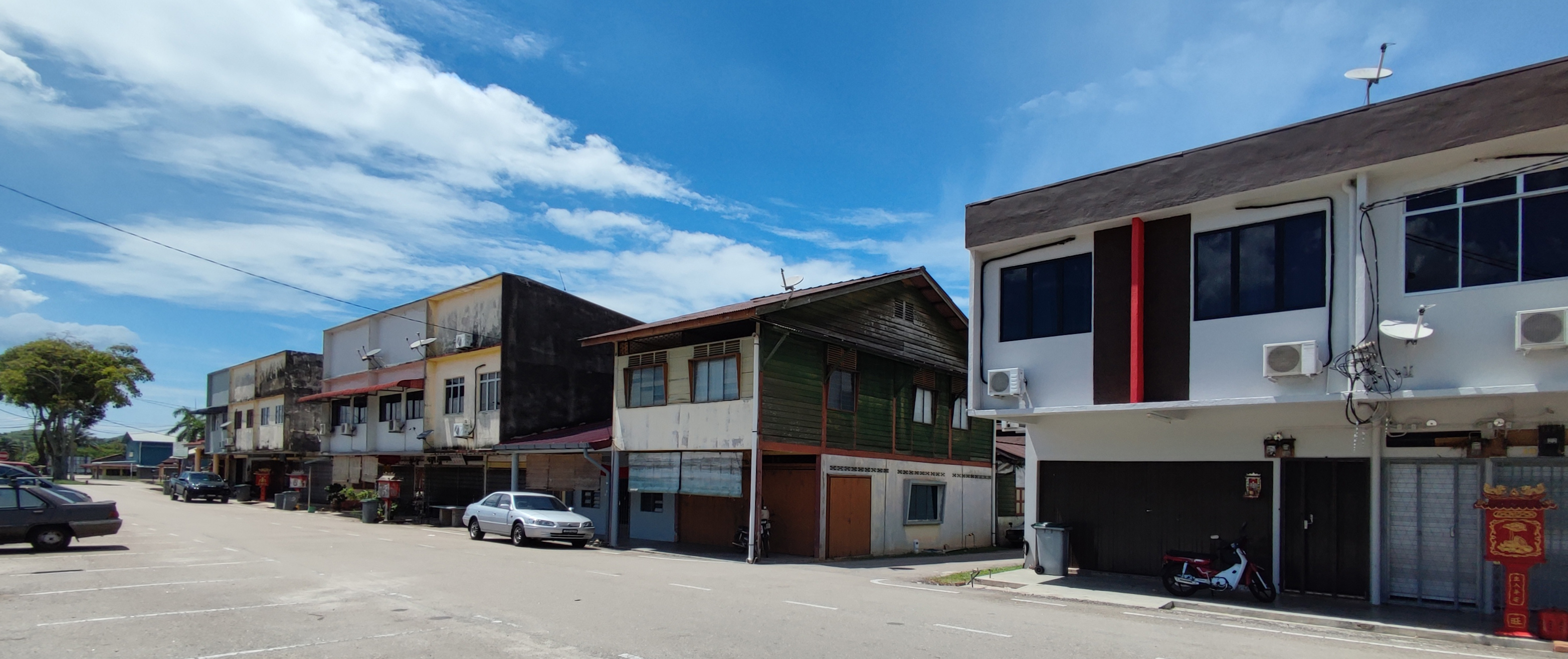
Kebun Bahru is a town bordering with Jementah

Kebun Bahru is a small town in the northern part of Tangkak District, Johor, Malaysia.
