= Kesang, Johor =

Mukim (subdivision) in Tangkak District, Johor, Malaysia

Coordinates: 2°07′N 102°30′E

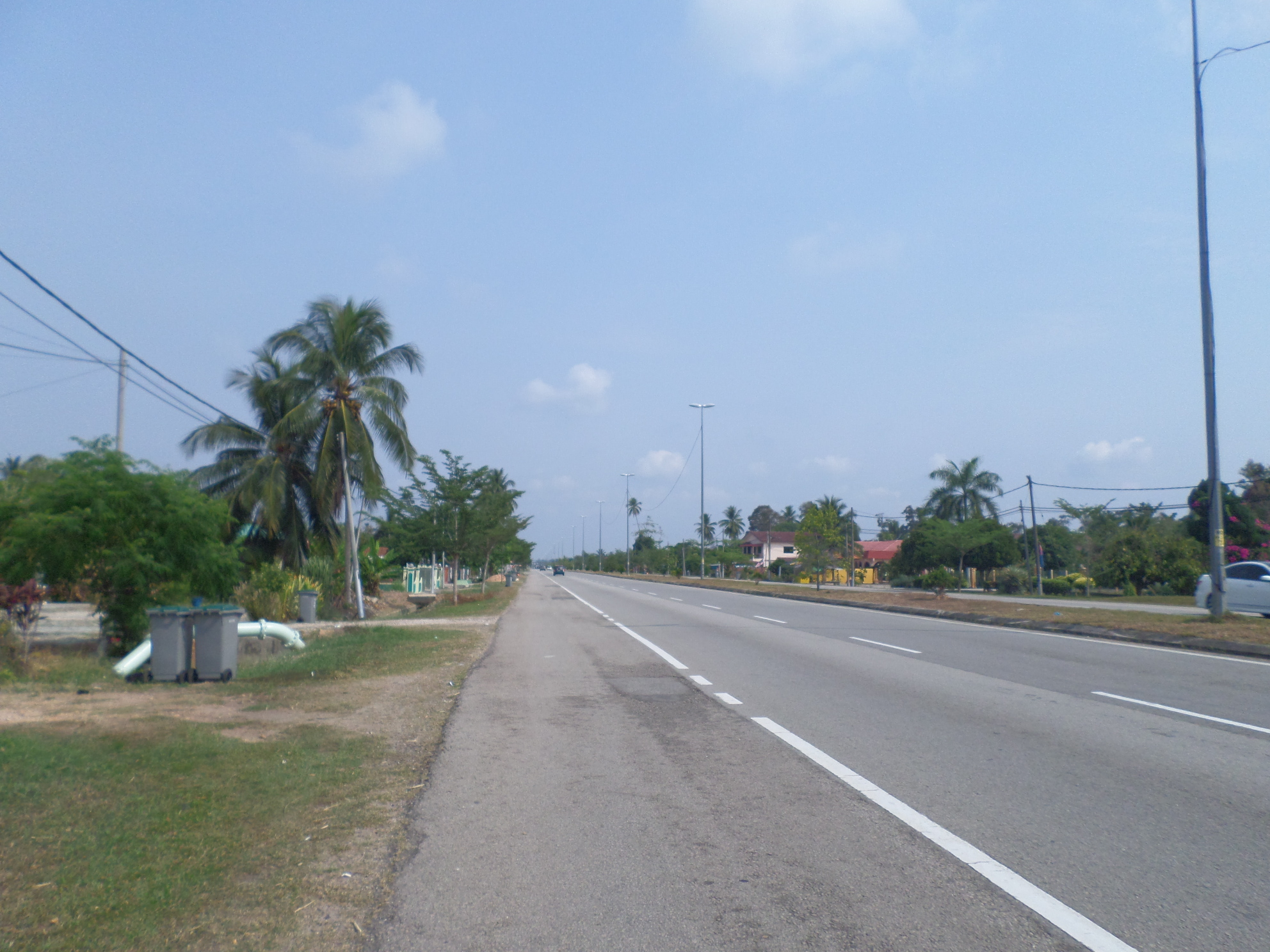
Kesang

Kesang in Tangkak District

Kesang is a mukim in Tangkak District, Johor, Malaysia.

== Geography ==
Kesang spreads across 38 km^{2} of land with a population of 10,598 people.

== Towns ==
- Parit Bunga
