= Bukit Kangkar =

Coordinates: 2°10′N 102°33′E

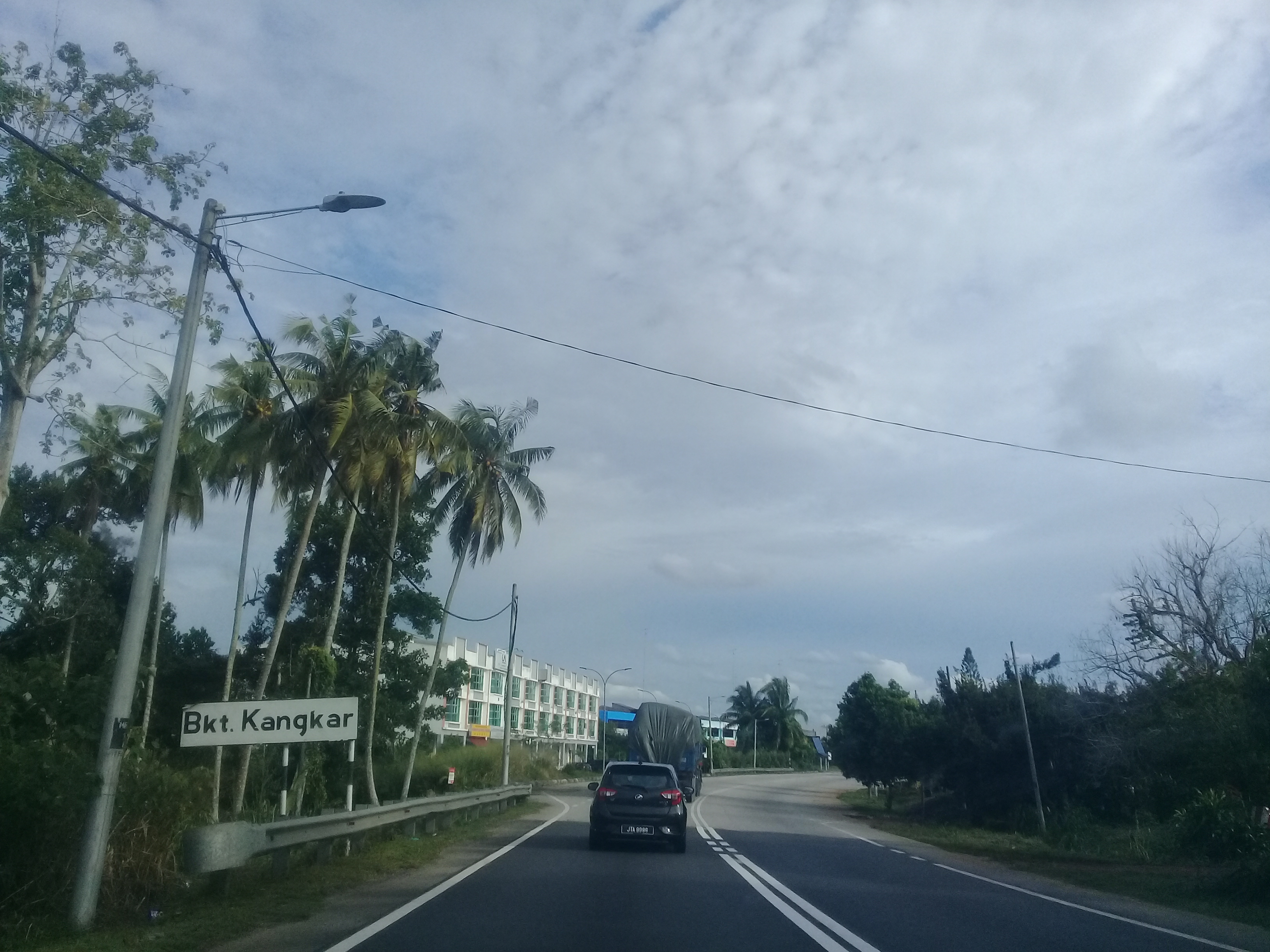
- Bukit Kangkar sign.
- Interactive map of Bukit Kangkar
- Country: Malaysia
- State: Johor
- District: Tangkak District

Bukit Kangkar in Tangkak District

Bukit Kangkar is a small town in Mukim Serom, Tangkak District, Johor, Malaysia. The town is approximately 16 km from Muar and 12 km from Tangkak. The town is centered on villages and modern housing areas. The 2 main villages are Kampung Parit Pelampong and Kampung Gelugur.

It is the first town on the way to Muar from the toll exit in Tangkak Interchange of the PLUS Expressways. It is easily identified once you've catch a glimpse of 2 big water tank from the road. Off 3 km away from Bukit Kangkar, Sungai Mati, is the place of origin of the former Menteri Besar of Johor Tan Sri Abdul Ghani Othman.

It is also the place of origin of the Founder and Principal Seni Silat Sendeng Malaysia the late Haji Abdul Hamid Bin Hamzah who was born and had lived here up to his last days.
