= Tangkak (state constituency) =

Political subdivision in Malaysia

Tangkak (N10)
Johor constituency

State constituency
- Legislature: Johor State Legislative Assembly
MLA
Haw Chin Teck
BN
- Constituency created: 1959
- First contested: 1959
- Last contested: 2026

Demographics
- Population (2020): 56,431
- Electors (2026): 36,955
- Area (km²): 238

Tangkak is a state constituency in Johor, Malaysia, that is represented in the Johor State Legislative Assembly.

The state constituency was first contested in 1959 and is mandated to return a single Assemblyman to the Johor State Legislative Assembly under the first-past-the-post voting system.

== Demographics ==
As of 2020, Tangkak has a population of 56,431 people.

Ethnic breakdown of Tangkak's electorate as of 2026
1. Chinese (46.7%)
2. Malay (41.2%)
3. Indian (9.90%)
4. Other ethnicities (2.20%)

== History ==
=== Polling districts ===
According to the gazette issued on 2 July 2026, the Tangkak constituency has a total of 13 polling districts.

State constituency	Polling districts	Code	Location
Tangkak（N10）	Asahan Relau	144/10/01	SJK (C) Chung Hwa Asahan Muar; Balai Raya Kg. Kenangan Gemeh
Tangkak（N10）	Kampong Bahru Bekoh	144/10/02	SK Bekoh
Tangkak（N10）	Payamas	144/10/03	SMK Seri Tangkak
Tangkak（N10）	Jalan Sialang	144/10/04	SMK Ledang; SK Seri Ma'amor
Tangkak（N10）	Bandar Tangkak Utara	144/10/05	SK Sri Tangkak
Tangkak（N10）	Bandar Tangkak Timor	144/10/06	SJK (C) Chi Ming 2
Tangkak（N10）	Bandar Tangkak Selatan	144/10/07	SA Bandar Tangkak
Tangkak（N10）	Bandar Tangkak Barat	144/10/08	SJK (T) Jalan Sialang
Tangkak（N10）	Pengkalan Besar	144/10/09	SK Pengkalan Besar
Tangkak（N10）	Kampong Solok	144/10/10	Dewan Serbaguna Kg. Solok
Tangkak（N10）	Bukit Banjar	144/10/11	SK Bukit Banjar
Tangkak（N10）	Bandar Tangkak	144/10/12	SK Bandar Tangkak
Tangkak（N10）	Taman Tangkak Jaya	144/10/13	SMK Tun Mamat; SK Paya Mas

=== Representation history ===
Members of the Legislative Assembly for Tangkak
Assembly	No	Years	Member	Party
Constituency created
1st	N31	1959-1964	Lai Kuen Tee (赖君棣)	Alliance (MCA)
2nd	N31	1964-1969	Lai Kuen Tee (赖君棣)	Alliance (MCA)
		1969-1971	Assembly dissolved	
3rd	N31	1971–1973	Lai Kuen Tee (赖君棣)	Alliance (MCA)
3rd	N31	1973–1974	Lai Kuen Tee (赖君棣)	BN (MCA)
4th	N09	1974–1978	Lau Kheng Lay (刘庆礼)	BN (MCA)
5th	N09	1978–1982	Lau Kheng Lay (刘庆礼)	BN (MCA)
6th	N09	1982–1986	Lim Tong Keng (林重庆)	BN (MCA)
7th	N03	1986–1990	Yap Chik Dong (叶炽东)	BN (MCA)
8th	N03	1990–1995	Yap Chik Dong (叶炽东)	BN (MCA)
9th	N03	1995–1999	Yap Chik Dong (叶炽东)	BN (MCA)
10th	N03	1999–2004	Yap Chik Dong (叶炽东)	BN (MCA)
11th	N10	2004–2008	Yap Chik Dong (叶炽东)	BN (MCA)
12th	N10	2008–2013	Goh Tee Tee (吴池池)	BN (MCA)
13th	N10	2013–2018	Ee Chin Li (黃俊历)	PR (DAP)
14th	N10	2018-2022	Ee Chin Li (黃俊历)	PH (DAP)
15th	N10	2022–2026	Ee Chin Li (黃俊历)	PH (DAP)
16th	N10	2026-present	Haw Chin Teck (侯振德)	BN (MCA)

== Election results ==
Johor state election, 2026
Party	Candidate	Votes	%	∆%
BN	How Chin Teck	14,010	56.41	▲17.43
PH	Ee Chin Li	10,828	43.59	▲2.74
Total valid votes		24,838	100.00	
Total rejected ballots		298		
Unreturned ballots		41		
Turnout		25,177	68.13	▲11.18
Registered electors		36,955		
Majority		3,182	12.81	▲10.94
BN gain from PH		Swing		?

Johor state election, 2022
Party	Candidate	Votes	%	∆%
PH	Ee Chin Li	8,105	40.85	▲40.85
BN	Ong Chee Siang	7,733	38.98	▲0.55
PN	Chong Fat Full	3,092	15.58	▲15.58
PEJUANG	Muhd Airel Zabridin	789	3.98	▲3.98
Independent	Zainal Baharom A Kadir	121	0.61	▲0.61
Total valid votes		19,840	97.99	
Total rejected ballots		326	1.61	
Unreturned ballots		81	0.40	
Turnout		20,247	56.95	▼28.74
Registered electors		35,554		
Majority		372	1.87	▼21.27
PH hold		Swing		

Johor state election, 2018
Party	Candidate	Votes	%	∆%
PKR	Ee Chin Li	13,512	61.57	▲61.57
BN	Goh Tee Tee	8,435	38.43	▼7.71
Total valid votes		21,947	97.18	
Total rejected ballots		563	2.49	
Unreturned ballots		73	0.32	
Turnout		22,583	85.69	▼1.41
Registered electors		26,354		
Majority		5,077	23.14	▲15.42
PKR hold		Swing		

Johor state election, 2013
Party	Candidate	Votes	%	∆%
DAP	Ee Chin Li	10,729	53.86	▲4.91
BN	Goh Tee Tee	9,192	46.14	▼4.91
Total valid votes		19,921	97.74	
Total rejected ballots		438	2.15	
Unreturned ballots		22	0.11	
Turnout		20,381	87.10	▲11.50
Registered electors		23,394		
Majority		1,537	7.72	▲5.62
DAP gain from BN		Swing		?
Source(s) "KEPUTUSAN PILIHAN RAYA UMUM DEWAN UNDANGAN NEGERI".

Johor state election, 2008
Party	Candidate	Votes	%	∆%
BN	Goh Tee Tee	7,130	51.05	▼15.35
DAP	Lee Fu Haw	6,835	48.95	▲48.95
Total valid votes		13,965	96.22	
Total rejected ballots		522	3.60	
Unreturned ballots		27	0.18	
Turnout		14,514	75.60	▲3.81
Registered electors		19,198		
Majority		295	2.10	▼33.68
BN hold		Swing		
Source(s) "KEPUTUSAN PILIHAN RAYA UMUM DEWAN UNDANGAN NEGERI PERAK BAGI TAHUN 2008".

Johor state election, 2004
Party	Candidate	Votes	%	∆%
BN	Yap Chik Dong	8,817	66.39	▲66.39
PKR	Yau Ho Yong	3,890	30.61	▲30.61
Total valid votes		12,707	96.34	
Total rejected ballots		460	3.49	
Unreturned ballots		23	0.17	
Turnout		13,190	71.79	
Registered electors		18,374		
Majority		4,927	35.78	
BN hold		Swing		
Source(s) "KEPUTUSAN PILIHAN RAYA UMUM DEWAN UNDANGAN NEGERI PERAK BAGI TAHUN 2004".

Johor state election, 1999
Party	Candidate	Votes	%	∆%
On the nomination day, Yap Chik Dong won uncontested.
BN	Yap Chik Dong			
Total valid votes				
Total rejected ballots				
Unreturned ballots				
Turnout				
Registered electors		26,106		
Majority				
BN hold		Swing		
Source(s) "KEPUTUSAN PILIHAN RAYA UMUM DEWAN UNDANGAN NEGERI PERAK BAGI TAHUN 1999".

Johor state election, 1995
Party	Candidate	Votes	%	∆%
BN	Yap Chik Dong	13,271	77.87	▲14.58
DAP	Liang Toy Heng	3,771	22.13	▼14.58
Total valid votes		17,042	95.74	
Total rejected ballots		754	4.24	
Unreturned ballots		5	0.03	
Turnout		17,801	70.39	▼2.91
Registered electors		25,290		
Majority		9,500	55.74	▲29.16
BN hold		Swing		
Source(s) "KEPUTUSAN PILIHAN RAYA UMUM DEWAN UNDANGAN NEGERI PERAK BAGI TAHUN 1995".

Johor state election, 1990
Party	Candidate	Votes	%	∆%
BN	Yap Chik Dong	10,483	63.29	▼0.16
DAP	Tan Teck Joon	6,649	36.71	▲0.16
Total valid votes		17,132	95.16	
Total rejected ballots		871	4.84	
Unreturned ballots		0	0.00	
Turnout		18,003	73.30	▲1.46
Registered electors		24,561		
Majority		3,834	26.58	▼0.32
BN hold		Swing		
Source(s) "KEPUTUSAN PILIHAN RAYA UMUM DEWAN UNDANGAN NEGERI PERAK BAGI TAHUN 1990".

Johor state election, 1986
Party	Candidate	Votes	%	∆%
BN	Yap Chik Dong	10,050	63.45	▼9.55
DAP	Wang Keat Yit	5,790	36.55	▲36.55
Total valid votes		15,840	100.00	
Total rejected ballots		668		
Unreturned ballots		0		
Turnout		16,508	71.80	▼5.44
Registered electors		22,979		
Majority		4,260	26.89	▲5.59
BN hold		Swing		
Source(s) "KEPUTUSAN PILIHAN RAYA UMUM DEWAN UNDANGAN NEGERI PERAK BAGI TAHUN 1986".

Johor state election, 1982
Party	Candidate	Votes	%	∆%
BN	Lim Tong Keng	9,193	73.03	▲6.18
Independent	Ong Chee Wan	3,392	26.96	▲26.96
Total valid votes		12,585	100.00	
Total rejected ballots		288		
Unreturned ballots		0		
Turnout		12,873	75.04	▼1.20
Registered electors		17,152		
Majority		5,801	46.05	▲8.64
BN hold		Swing		

Johor state election, 1978
Party	Candidate	Votes	%	∆%
BN	Lau Kheng Lay	7,202	66.85	▼7.73
DAP	Chong Kee Kiam	3,174	29.45	▲5.77
PAS	Samingan Rabikun	398	3.69	▲3.69
Total valid votes		10,774	100.00	
Total rejected ballots		480		
Unreturned ballots		0		
Turnout		11,254	76.24	▲2.65
Registered electors		14,756		
Majority		4,028	37.41	▼11.72
BN hold		Swing		

Johor state election, 1974
Party	Candidate	Votes	%	∆%
BN	Lau Kheng Lay	7,091	74.58	▲74.58
DAP	Tey Chin Pow	2,419	25.44	▼13.85
Total valid votes		9,510	100.00	
Total rejected ballots		219		
Unreturned ballots		0		
Turnout		9,729	73.59	▲3.18
Registered electors		13,217		
Majority		4,672	49.13	▲27.75
BN hold		Swing		

Johor state election, 1969
Party	Candidate	Votes	%	∆%
Alliance	Lai Kuen Tee	6,632	60.71	▼13.01
DAP	Chiam Tau Boon	4,293	39.29	▲13.02
Total valid votes		10,925	100.00	
Total rejected ballots		310		
Unreturned ballots		0		
Turnout		11,235	70.41	▼5.68
Registered electors		15,950		
Majority		2,339	21.38	▼25.87
Alliance hold		Swing		

Johor state election, 1964
Party	Candidate	Votes	%	∆%
Alliance	Lai Kuen Tee	6,944	73.72	▼13.02
Socialist Front	Lim Chong See	2,477	26.27	▲13.01
Total valid votes		9,421	100.00	
Total rejected ballots		638		
Unreturned ballots		0		
Turnout		10,059	76.09	▲4.52
Registered electors		13,220		
Majority		4,467	47.40	▼29.72
Alliance hold		Swing		

Johor state election, 1959
Party	Candidate	Votes	%
Alliance	Lai Kuen Tee	6,067	86.74
National Party	Puteh Idros	669	9.56
Independent	Ahmad Arshad	258	3.69
Total valid votes		6,994	100.00
Total rejected ballots		247	
Unreturned ballots		0	
Turnout		7,241	71.57
Registered electors		10,115	
Majority		5,398	77.12
This was a new seat.
