= Sagil =

- Town in Malaysia

Other transcription(s)
  - Chinese: 砂益
  - Tamil: சாகில்
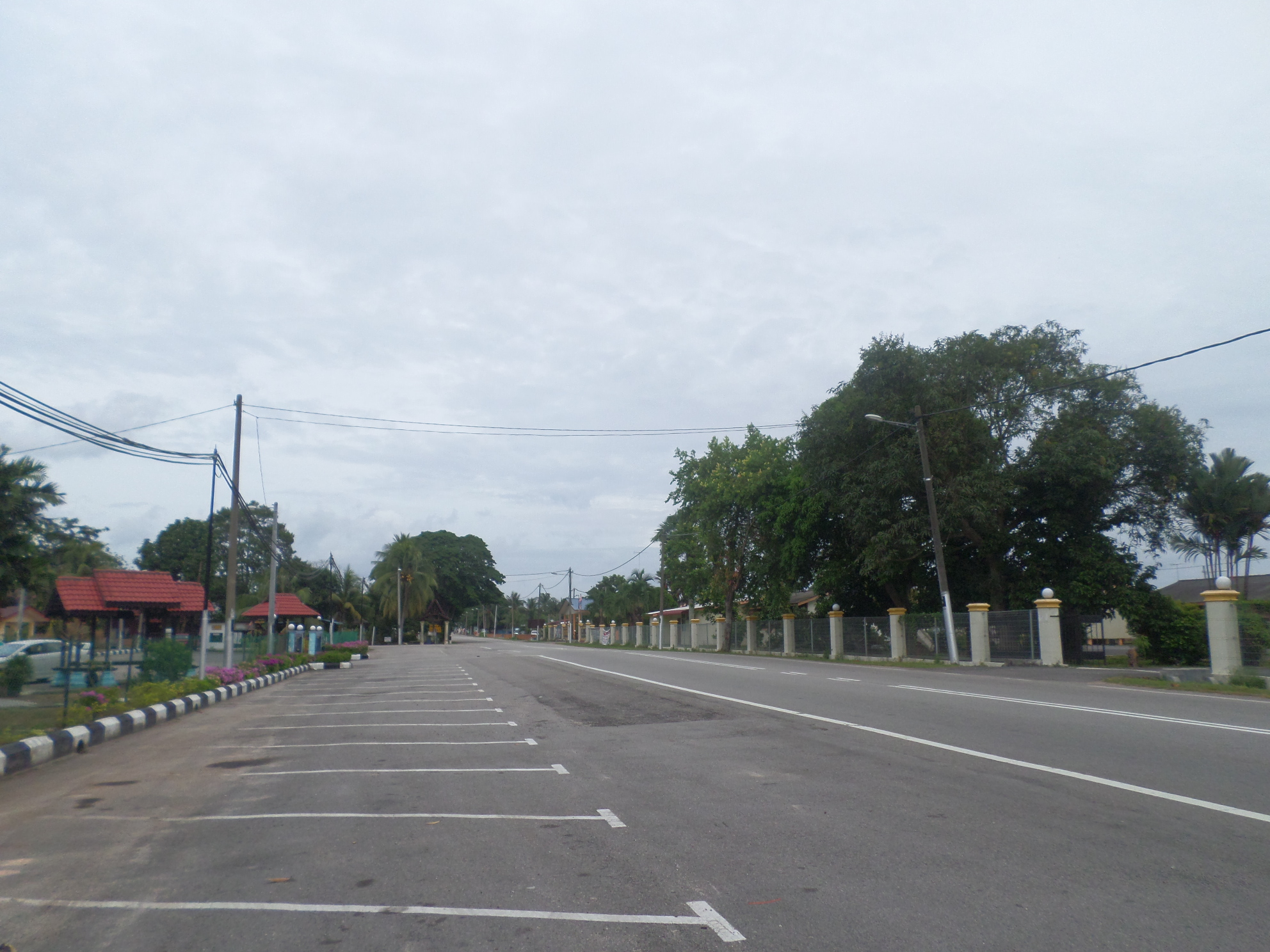
- Road in small town Sagil

- Sagil in Johor, Malay Peninsular and Malaysia Sagil (Peninsular Malaysia) Sagil (Malaysia)
- Coordinates: 2°18′N 102°37′E
- Country: Malaysia
- State: Johor
- District: Tangkak
- Time zone: UTC+8 (MYT)
- Postal code: 84900

Sagil (Chinese:砂益; Tamil: சாகில்) is a small settlement in Tangkak District, Johor, Malaysia. Sagil is near the border of Johor with Malacca. Air Panas Waterfall is located here, and access to the peak of Gunung Ledang. Gunung Ledang is around 5 minute driving distance from Sagil town.

There are various villages here, such as:

- Kampung Sagil Parit Satu
- Kampung Sagil Parit Dua
- Kampung Sagil Parit Tiga
- Kampung Konggo
- Kampung Melayu Raya
- Kampung Hang Tuah
- Kampung Melepang

== Location ==
Sagil is a small area located between Bandar Segamat and Bandar Tangkak. From Plaza Tol Tangkak, it takes a 13.4 km distance and from Plaza tol Bukit Gambir, it takes 15 km distance. Sagil is located in Parlimen Ledang (P144) under YB Syed Ibrahim Syed Noh and Dun Gambir under YAB Tan Sri Muhyiddin Bin Hj Muhammad Yassin.

== Education ==
Here there are a variety of types of schools and college:

Primary school:

- SK Sagil Kampung
- SK Puteri Ledang, Sagil
- SJK(C) Chee Chuin
- SJK(T) Ladang Sagil

Secondary school:

- SMK Sagil, Tangkak

Colleges:

- Institut Latihan Perindustrian Tangkak

All schools here administered under PPD Tangkak.(Ledang District Education Office was established on December 1, 2014).
