= Mount Ledang =

Mountain in Malaysia

Coordinates: 2°22′24″N 102°36′28″E

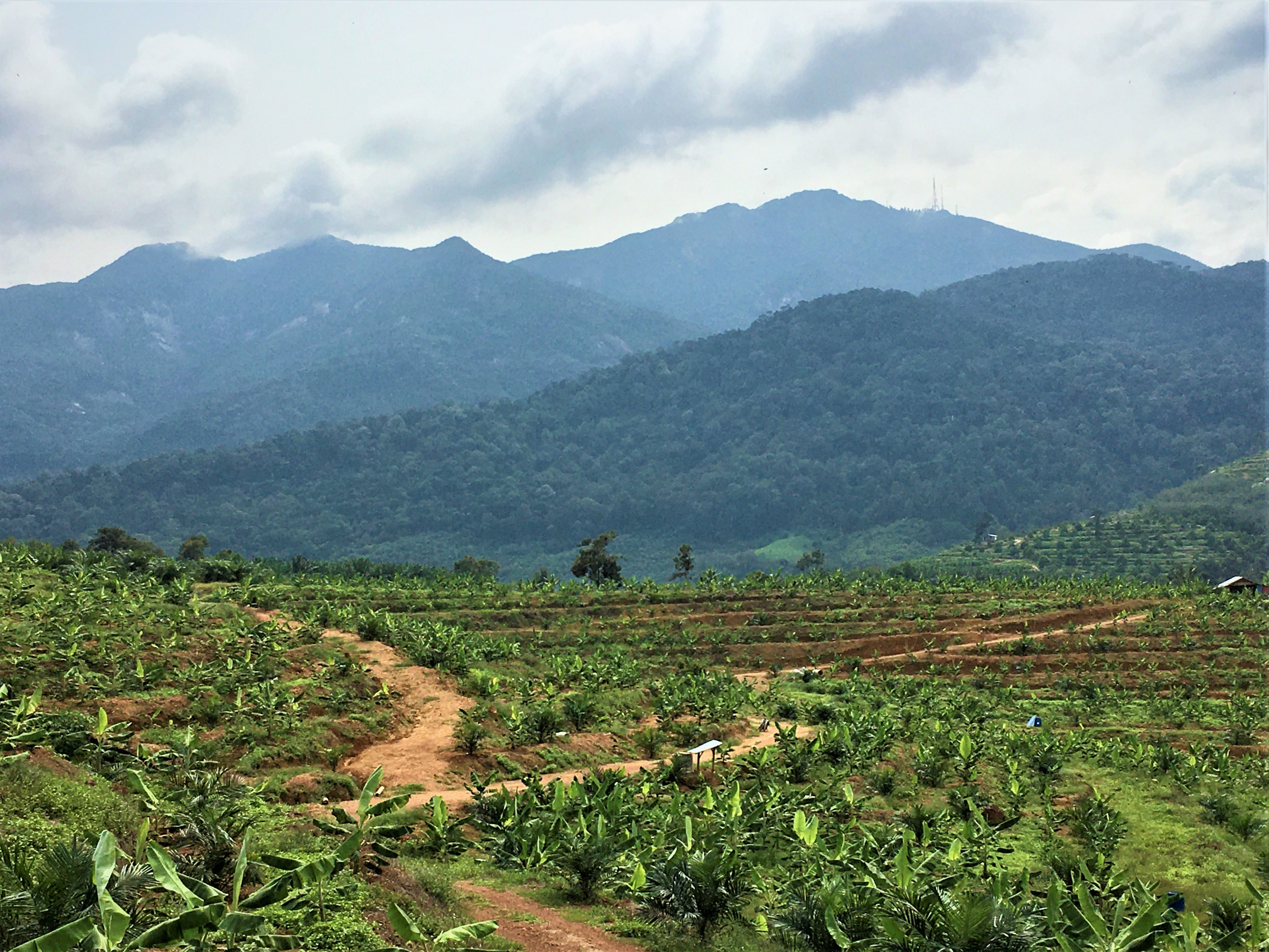
- Northern face of Ledang, viewed from Asahan, Malacca

Highest point
- Elevation: 1,276 m (4,186 ft)
- Prominence: 1,204 m (3,950 ft)
- Listing: Ribu

Naming
- Native name: Gunung Ledang (Malay)

Geography
- Location within Malaysia
- Location: Tangkak District, Johor

Geology
- Mountain type: Inselberg

Climbing
- Easiest route: Hiking via Sagil Route (south) or Asahan Route (north)

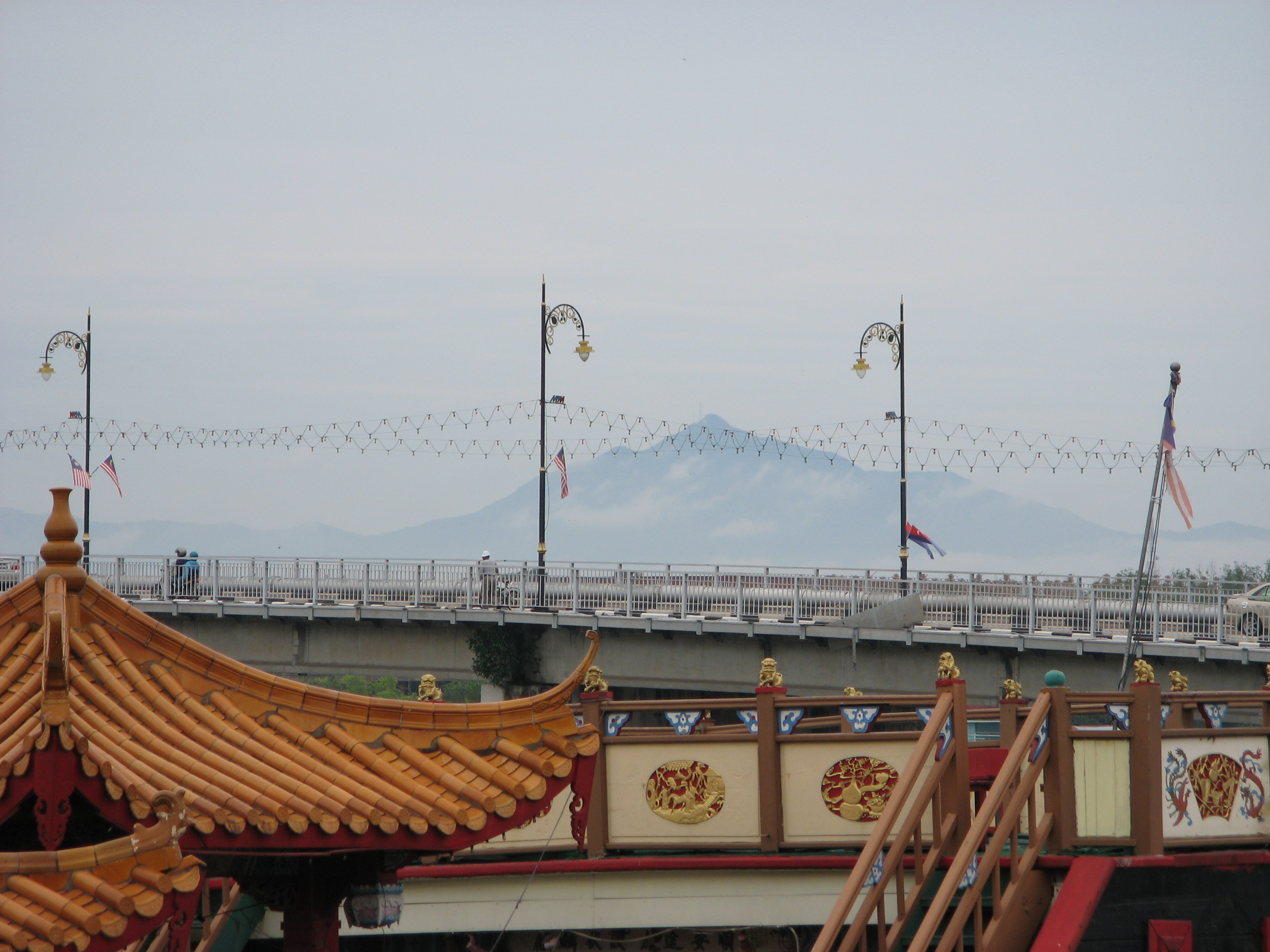
Mount Ledang as seen from Muar

Mount Ledang (Malay: Gunung Ledang; historically also: Mount Ophir) is a mountain located in Tangkak District, Johor, Malaysia. The summit is located next to the tripoint of Tangkak, Jasin and Tampin districts, located in the states of Johor, Malacca and Negeri Sembilan, respectively. Standing at 1,276 m (4,186 ft), it is the 64th highest mountain in Malaysia and the highest peak in Johor.

Mount Ledang is the centrepiece of Gunung Ledang National Park.

== Etymology ==
There are a few popular opinions regarding the origin of the mountain's name.

The attested version is Javanese during the period of the Majapahit empire named the mountain as Gunong Ledang, which means 'lofty mountain', from Old Javanese word ledang meaning 'show-off'.

Another source (unattested) said that the Chinese seafarers plying the Straits of Malacca called it Kim Sua meaning the 'golden mountain', likely from the Hokkien or Teochew words: kim (金) meaning gold and suann (山) meaning mountain.

== In Malay folklore ==
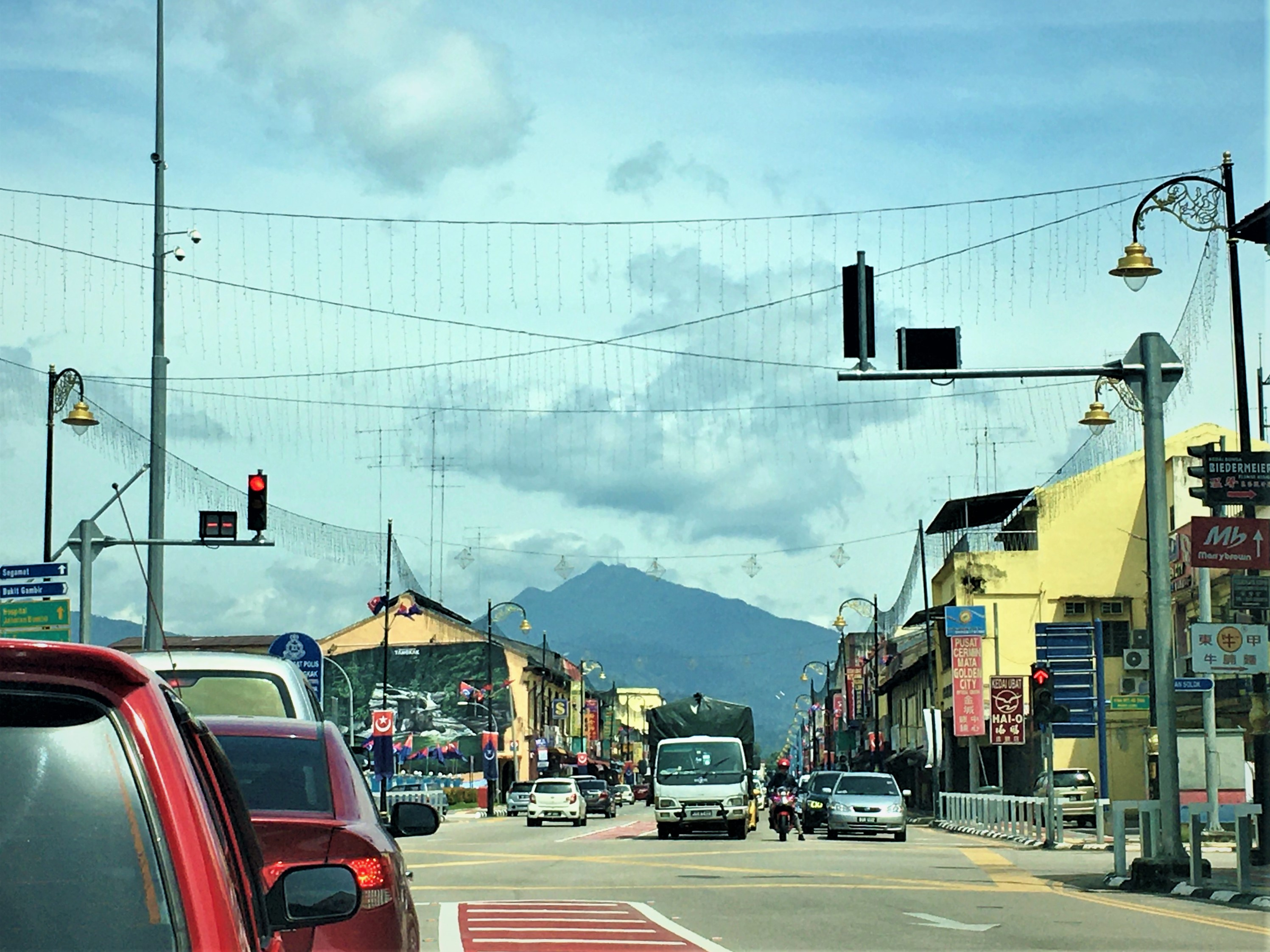
View of the mountain from Tangkak

Mount Ledang is one of the most celebrated mountains in Malay folklore, notably the Legend of Gunung Ledang. It is a folklore which told of a princess with magical powers who resided on the mountain. She was wooed to be the wife of the then Sultan of Malacca, Sultan Mahmud Shah. However, she set seven impossible conditions for him as a means to reject his proposal.

The conditions were:

- A bridge of gold for her to walk to Malacca from the mountain,
- A bridge of silver for her to return from Malacca to the mountain,
- Seven large clay jars of virgin's tears,
- Seven large clay jars of betel nut juice,
- Seven trays filled with hearts of fleas,
- Seven trays filled with hearts of mosquitoes, and
- A bowl of the blood of the Sultan's young son.

Some versions of the legend say that the Sultan was not able to fulfill any of these requests, while others say that he was able to fulfill the first six requests (thus causing the ruin of the Malacca Sultanate) but could not fulfill the final request which would have required him to kill his son.

Yet another version says that the Sultan approached his sons sleeping body and as he drew close with a dagger in hand the image of the Princess appeared before the Sultan and said to him that she could not possibly marry a man willing to wound his own son before vanishing, never to be seen again.

The point of the story is that the Sultan was either too proud or too blind to realise that the conditions were the Puteri's way of turning his proposal down.

Folklore has it that the gold and silver supposedly found on the mountain are attributed to; and a testament to this story. Hang Tuah and his companions were also learning their silat martial arts here on the top of this very mountain with a silat guru, Adiputera.

=== In poetry ===
A traditional Malay pantun makes the mountain proverbial:

Berapa tinggi pucuk pinang
Tinggi lagi asap api
Berapa tinggi Gunung Ledang
Tinggi lagi harapan hati.

However high is the trunk of the betel-nut tree,
Higher is the smoke of fire.
However high is Mount Ledang,
Higher are the hopes of the heart.

== See also ==
- Protected areas of Johor
- List of mountains of Malaysia
