= Panchor =

Town in Johor, Malaysia

Panchor (est. pop.: 5,000) is a small town in Muar District, Johor, Malaysia, located next to Muar River. Panchor was formerly a bustling river port where agricultural and plantation produce, (e.g. rice, palm oil, rubber latex) from the interior are loaded downriver on barges. However, as the road networks began to improve in the 1970s, which culminated with the construction of the North–South Expressway in the 1980s, Panchor declined in importance as barge river traffic decreased sharply. However, the opening of industrial parks in the vicinity brought a small revival in the town's population and its economy. In late 2006 and early 2007, Panchor was affected by the worst floods in Johor in over 100 years. that village affected is Kg Sg Ranggam, Sg Alai, Kg Terus, Kg Melayu, Semaseh and Kg Jawa. The Pekan Panchor is also famous for 'mengail udang' or fresh water prawning.
