= Tangkak District =

District in Johor, Malaysia

- District of Johor
- Daerah Tangkak
- Flag
- Motto: Berusaha untuk Makmur (in Malay) "Striving to Prosper"
- Location of Tangkak District in Johor
- Interactive map of Tangkak District
- Location of Tangkak District in Malaysia
- Coordinates: 2°16′N 102°33′E
- Country: Malaysia
- State: Johor
- Seat: Tangkak
- Local area government(s): Tangkak District Council

Government
  - District officer: Haji Shafiei bin Ahamad

Area
  - Total: 970.24 km^{2} (374.61 sq mi)

Population (2020)
  - Total: 163,449
  - Density: 168.46/km^{2} (436.32/sq mi)
- Time zone: UTC+8 (MST)
  - Summer (DST): UTC+8 (Not observed)
- Postcode: 849xx
- Calling code: +6-06
- Vehicle registration plates: J

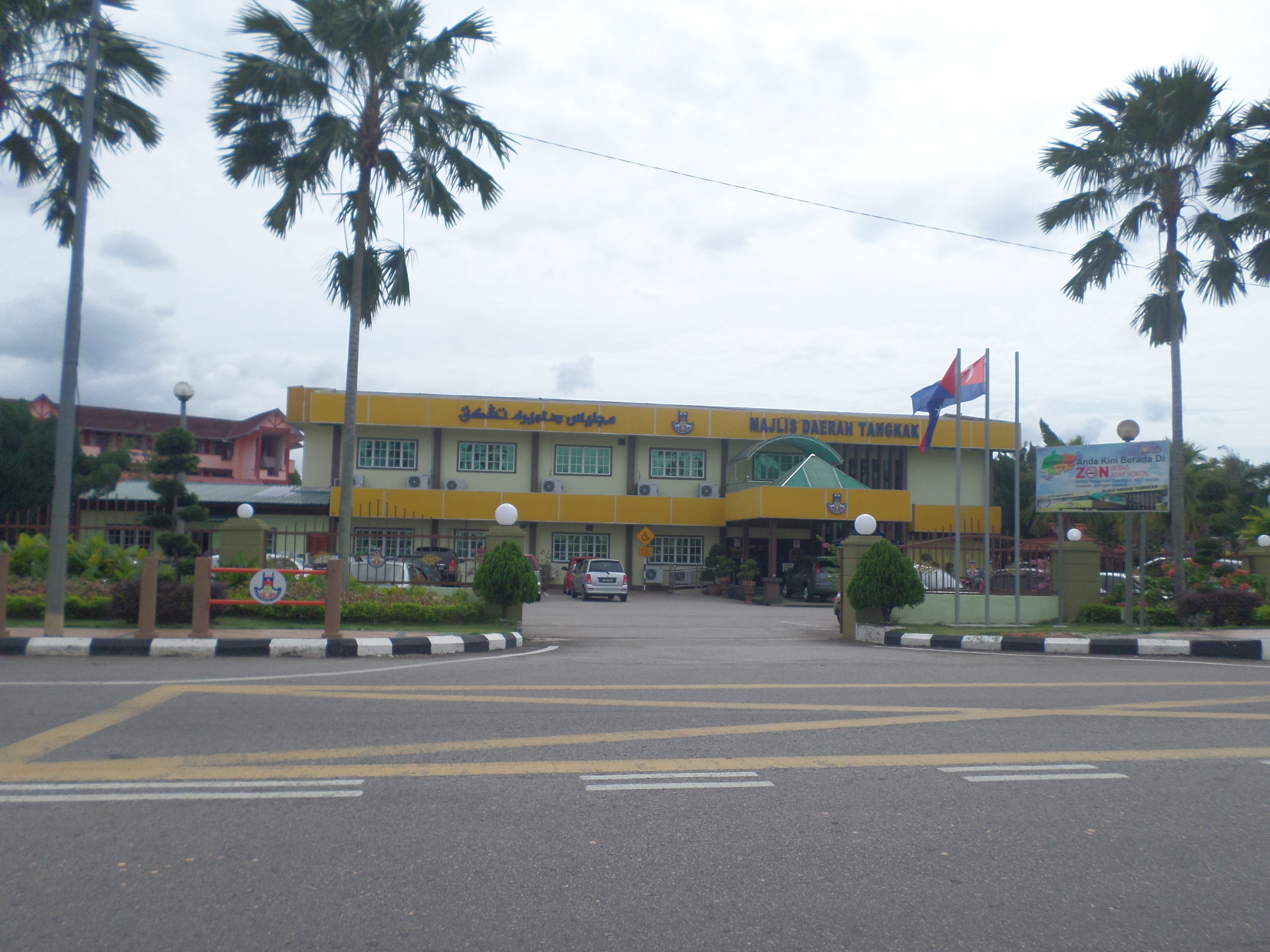
Tangkak District Council

The Tangkak District is a district in western Johor, Malaysia, bordering Muar District to the south, Segamat District to the northeast, and Jasin District, Malacca to the west. The district also shares an 11 kilometre border with Tampin District, Negeri Sembilan to the northwest. The district capital and largest settlement is the town of Tangkak. Other towns include Sagil, Sungai Mati and Tanjung Agas.

== Geography ==
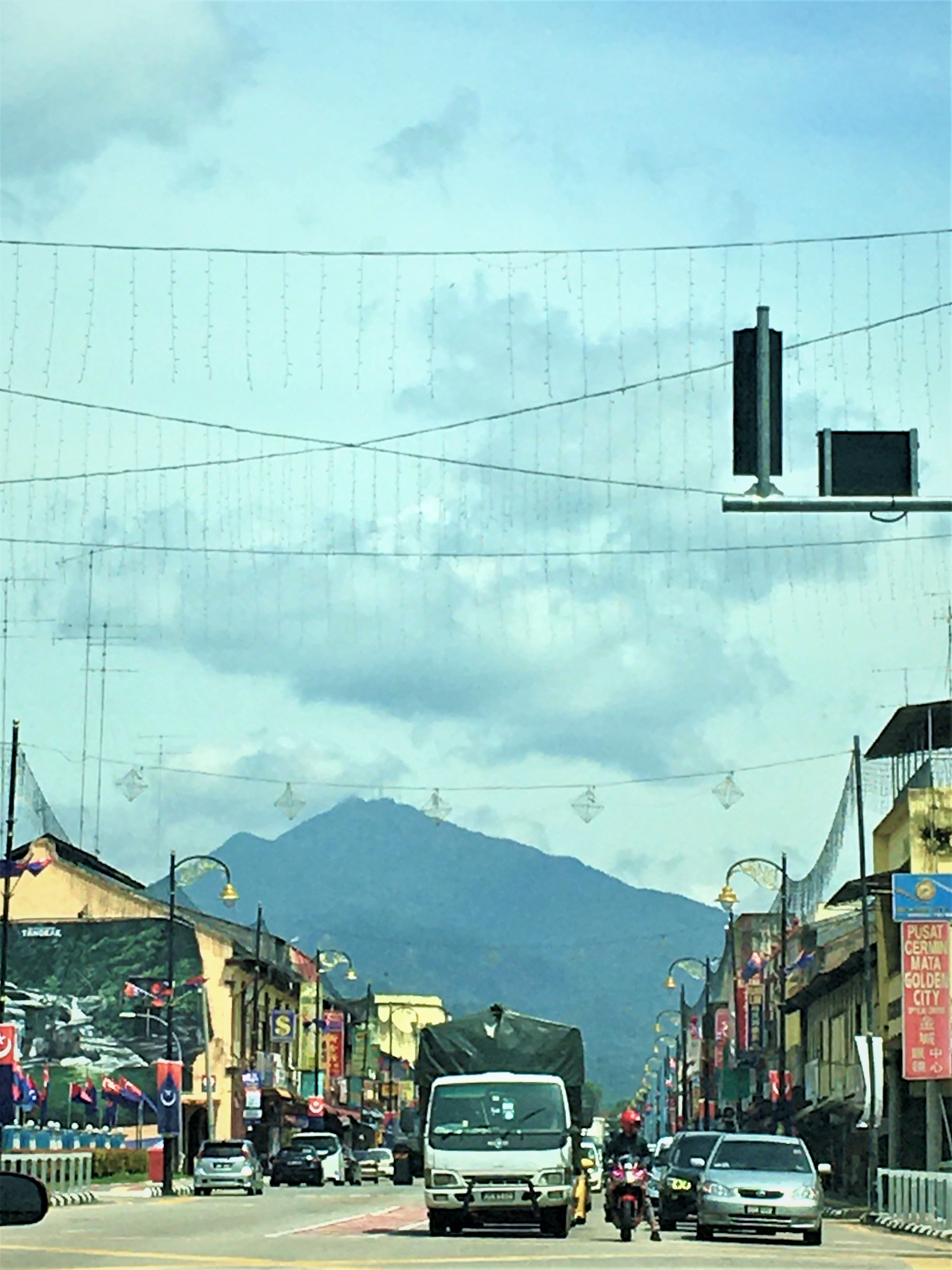
Mount Ledang, the prominent landmark of the district. Seen from downtown Tangkak.

Along with Muar, Batu Pahat and Segamat, Tangkak District is one of the districts that constitute the northern part of Johor. The Muar River delineates the boundary with Muar District to its south, from Durian Chondong in the east towards Tanjung Agas on the Malacca Strait coast. To its northeast, the district's famed landmark, Mount Ledang, is situated close to the tripoint between the neighbouring states of Malacca and Negeri Sembilan, where it is the highest point statewide at 1,276 metres (4,186 ft).

== History ==
The district was previously an autonomous sub-district (daerah kecil) covering the north-western part of the Muar District, separated from Muar Town proper by the Muar River. A ceremony headed by the sultan on 9 June 2008 saw the official proclamation of that part becoming Johor's 10th district, then named Ledang District after the eponymous mountain located within its borders. The district was then renamed Tangkak District at the end of 2015 by a decree of Sultan Ibrahim to preserve the historical value of traditional name of places in the state.

== Administrative divisions ==

Tangkak District is divided into:

=== Mukims ===
- Bukit Serampang
- Grisek
- Kesang
- Kundang
- Serom
- Tangkak

=== Towns (Bandar) ===
- Bukit Kangkar
- Parit Bunga
- Serom
- Sungai Mati
- Tangkak
- Tanjung Agas

=== Hamlets (Pekan) ===
- Grisek

== Townships ==
- Tangkak
- Kesang
- Tanjung Agas
- Bukit Gambir
- Sungai Mati
- Parit Bunga
- Bukit Kangkar
- Pekan Rawang
- Bukit Serampang
- Kundang Ulu
- Serom
- Kesang
- Sagil
- Kebun Bahru
- Gerisek

== Demographics ==
Historical population
Year	Pop.	±%
2010	131,890	—
2020	163,449	+23.9%
Figures before 2008 is included under Muar District. Source:

== Federal Parliament and State Assembly Seats ==
List of Tangkak district representatives in the Federal Parliament (Dewan Rakyat)

Parliament	Seat Name	Member of Parliament	Party
P143	Pagoh	Muhyiddin Yassin	Perikatan Nasional (BERSATU)
P144	Ledang	Syed Ibrahim Syed Noh	Pakatan Harapan (PKR)

List of Tangkak district representatives in the State Legislative Assembly (Dewan Negeri)

Parliament	State	Seat Name	State Assemblyman	Party
P143	N7	Bukit Kepong	Sahruddin Jamal	Perikatan Nasional (BERSATU)
P144	N9	Gambir	Sahrihan Jani	Barisan Nasional (UMNO)
P144	N10	Tangkak	Ee Chin Li	Pakatan Harapan (DAP)
P144	N11	Serom	Khairin Nisa Ismail	Barisan Nasional (UMNO)

== Economy ==
The main economy activities in the district are lifestyle tourism, adventure sports, light manufacturing and agriculture. Main industrial areas in the district are Desa Serom, Desa Sungai Mati, Gerisek, Sagil and Tangkak Industrial Areas.

== Tourist attractions ==
=== Mount Ledang National Park ===
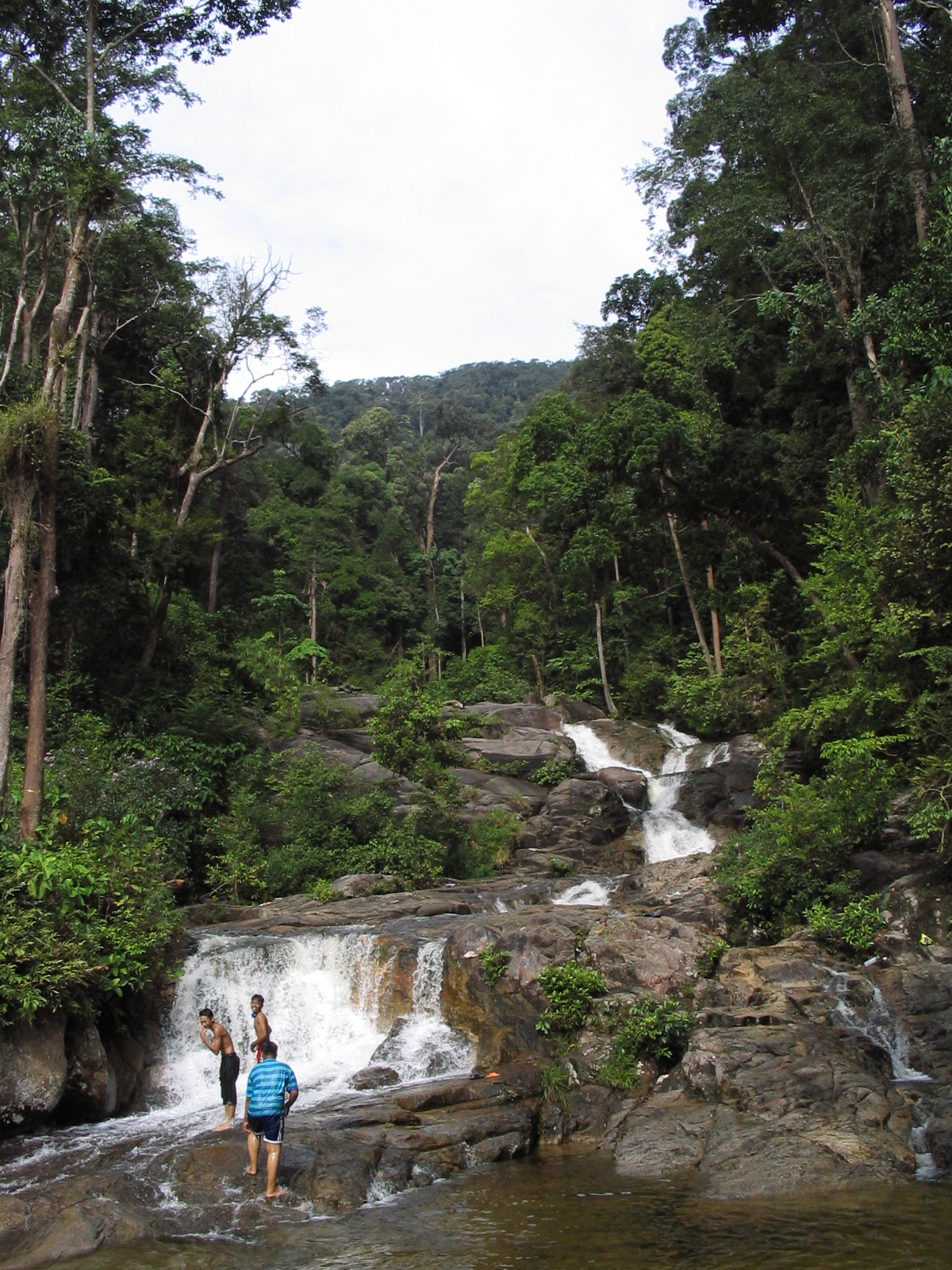
A waterfall in Gunung Ledang National Park

One of the main tourist attractions of Tangkak is the Gunung Ledang National Park. The park is situated 170 km from Johor Bahru and has an area of 107 km^{2}. The park has two entry points, one in Sagil and the other in Asahan, from the Malaccan side. Mount Ledang's peak, which is 1,276 m above sea level, is the highest point in Johor and has been frequently climbed by many people all year round. Sagil Falls, which is also in the park is a famous picnic site. Mount Ledang is also widely recognised as a friendly training venue for amateur (or beginners) mountain hikers/climbers.

== See also ==
- Legend of Gunung Ledang
