= Sungai Mati =

- Town in Malaysia

Other transcription(s)
  - Chinese: 利丰港
- Sungai Mati in Johor, Malay Peninsular and Malaysia Sungai Mati (Peninsular Malaysia) Sungai Mati (Malaysia)
- Country: Malaysia
- State: Johor
- District: Tangkak
- Time zone: UTC+8 (MYT)
- Postal code: 84400

Sungai Mati in Tangkak District

Sungai Mati ('dead river' in Malay; Chinese: 利丰港) is a small town in Serom, Tangkak District, Johor, Malaysia.

Sungai Mati was named in such a way (dead river) due to its nature of being an ox-bow lake. It formed or break away from the main river of Muar River. The "breakaway" was caused by a massive flood in the early 1900s (not traceable). Before the breakaway Sungai Mati was on the Muar river bank (northern bank) and was a river port.

Before the breakaway Sungai Mati was named 'li hong kang' 利丰港. It means a prosperous port. Until now, the Chinese community still uses the same name, which carries both extreme meanings. In fact, it was an inland/river port. Muar River and Pahang River in combination was very important east-west crossing route for traditional river transport. The route is called "Laluan Penarikan", which is documented and available in Malaysia's secondary history text. The piece of land surrounded by the ex-bow lake and Muar River in combination is called Pulau Penarik.

In the early 1970s, there were some remaining traces of the riverport. There was landing of jetty at the end of Jalan Raja, the current location of the bridge linking Sungai Mati and Pulau Penarik. On the current badminton and tennis court on the left of Jalan Raja, diagonally opposite incumbent Johor Menteri Besar resident were old warehouses.

== Notable residents ==
- Tan Sri Abdul Ghani Othman, the 14th Menteri Besar of Johor.
