= Bukit Gambir =

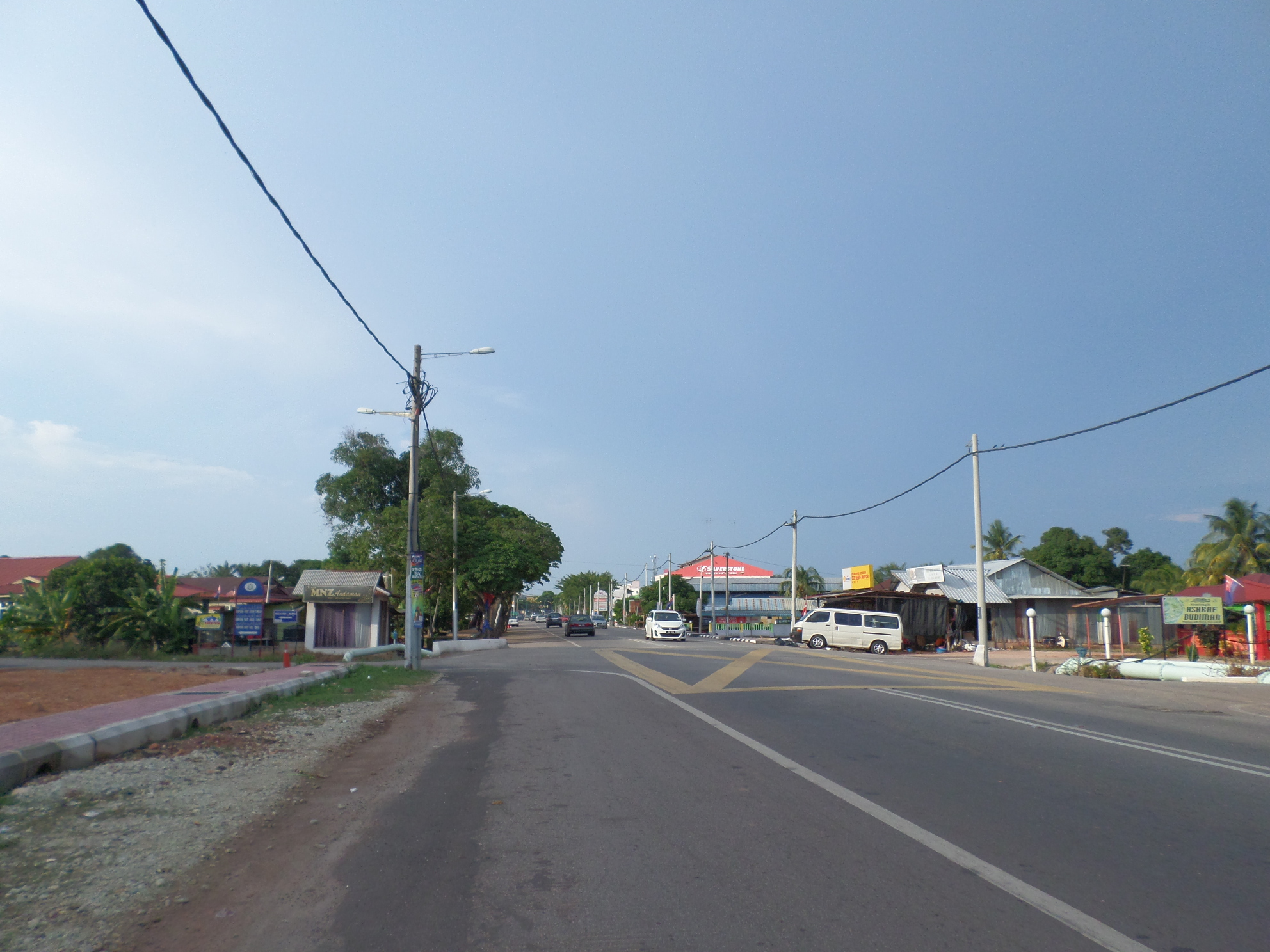
- Interactive map of Bukit Gambir
- Country: Malaysia
- State: Johor
- District: Tangkak District

Population
  - Total: 40,000

Bukit Gambir is a small town in Tangkak District, Johor, Malaysia.

== History ==
The area was declared a town in 2003.

== Geography ==
The town consists of 40,000 residents.

== Education ==
=== Primary schools ===
School Code	School name	Postcode	Coordinates
JBA9006	Sekolah Kebangsaan Simpang 5 Pekan	84800	2.1988°N 102.6369°E
JBA9007	Sekolah Kebangsaan Simpang 5 Darat	84800	2.2335°N 102.6162°E
JBA9012	Sekolah Kebangsaan Sengkang	84800	2.2878°N 102.6915°E
JBA9024	Sekolah Kebangsaan Bukit Gambir	84800	2.2099°N 102.6517°E
JBA9035	Sekolah Kebangsaan Parit Kasan	84800	2.2326°N 102.6293°E
JBC9002	Sekolah Jenis Kebangsaan (Cina) Chian Kuo	84800	2.2133°N 102.6540°E
JBC9011	Sekolah Jenis Kebangsaan (Cina) Kok Beng	84800	2.2620°N 102.6819°E
JBC9017	Sekolah Jenis Kebangsaan (Cina) San Yu	84800	2.1946°N 102.6308°E

=== Secondary school ===
School Code	School name	Postcode	Coordinates
JEA9010	Sekolah Menengah Kebangsaan Bukit Gambir	84800	2.2180°N 102.6658°E

== Transportation ==
- Bukit Gambir Road

== Religious places ==
Islamic Religious Places (Mosques / Madrasah) Masjid Jamek Kampung Parit 2, Tangkak (Main mosque serving the local Muslim community)

Madrasah Riyaad Al-Ma’arif (Islamic religious school / madrasah located north of Bukit Gambir town)

Chinese Buddhist / Taoist Temples Ho Her Kuan Yin Temple (天云寺) (Chinese Buddhist temple located within Bukit Gambir town)

== Notable natives ==
- Onn Jaafar
