= Tampin (federal constituency) =

Constituency of Negeri Sembilan, Malaysia

Tampin (P133)
Negeri Sembilan constituency

Federal constituency
- Legislature: Dewan Rakyat
- MP: Mohd Isam Mohd Isa; BN
- Constituency created: 1974
- First contested: 1974
- Last contested: 2022

Demographics
- Population (2020): 88,123
- Electors (2023): 81,534
- Area (km²): 861
- Pop. density (per km²): 102.3

Tampin is a federal constituency in Tampin District, Negeri Sembilan, Malaysia, that has been represented in the Dewan Rakyat since 1974.

The federal constituency was created in the 1974 redistribution and is mandated to return a single member to the Dewan Rakyat under the first past the post voting system.

== Demographics ==
Ethnic breakdown of Tampin's electorate as of 2022
1. Malay (63.1%)
2. Chinese (23.7%)
3. Indian (12.1%)
4. Other ethnicities (1.10%)

As of 2020, Tampin has a population of 88,123 people.

Age breakdown of Tampin's electorate as of 2022
1. 18-20 (5.00%)
2. 21-29 (20.6%)
3. 30-39 (25.5%)
4. 40-49 (17.6%)
5. 50-59 (12.4%)
6. 60-69 (11.3%)
7. 70-79 (5.44%)
8. 80-89 (1.89%)
9. above 90 (0.29%)
Gender breakdown of Tampin's electorate as of 2022
1. Male (50.6%)
2. Female (49.4%)

== History ==
=== Polling districts ===
According to the gazette issued on 23 July 2026, the Tampin constituency has a total of 30 polling districts.

State constituency	Polling districts	Code	Location
Gemas（N34）	FELDA Jelai 1 & 3	133/34/01	SK Jelai 1; SK Jelai 3 (FELDA)
Gemas（N34）	Pasir Besar	133/34/02	SMK FELDA Pasir Besar (FELDA)
Gemas（N34）	FELDA Pasir Besar	133/34/03	SK (FELDA) Pasir Besar
Gemas（N34）	Kampong Ladang	133/34/04	SK Kampong Ladang
Gemas（N34）	Pekan Gemas	133/34/05	SK Gemas
Gemas（N34）	Taman Sentosa	133/34/06	SMK Gemas; SK Tuanku Abdul Rahman
Gemas（N34）	FELDA Jelai 2 &4	133/34/07	SK Jelai 2 (FELDA); SMK Jelai (FELDA)
Gemencheh (N35)	Sungai Kelamah	133/35/01	SK Sungai Kelamah 'RKTP'
Gemencheh (N35)	Gememcheh Lama	133/35/02	SK Datuk Abdullah
Gemencheh (N35)	Gemencheh Bahru	133/35/03	SMK Dato' Mohd Taha; SJK (C) Sin Min Gemencheh
Gemencheh (N35)	Kampong Bahru Gedok	133/35/04	SJK (C) Kg Baru Gedok
Gemencheh (N35)	Gedok	133/35/05	SK Gedok
Gemencheh (N35)	Ayer Kuning Selatan	133/35/06	SJK (C) Air Kuning Selatan
Gemencheh (N35)	Bukit Jalor	133/35/07	SK (FELDA) Bukit Jalor
Gemencheh (N35)	Kampong Tengah	133/35/08	SK Air Kuning Selatan
Gemencheh (N35)	Kampung Mantai	133/35/09	Balai Raya Kampung Mantai
Gemencheh (N35)	Ladang Regent	133/35/10	SJK (T) Ladang Regent
Gemencheh (N35)	Pekan Batang Melaka	133/35/11	Balai Raya Kampong Punggor Batang Melaka
Gemencheh (N35)	Bukit Rotan Utara	133/35/12	SK Bukit Rokan Utara
Gemencheh (N35)	Bukit Rokan	133/35/13	SK Bukit Rokan (LKTP)
Gemencheh (N35)	Kampong Rokan	133/35/14	SK Rokan
Gemencheh (N35)	Kampong Sungai Jerneh	133/35/15	SK Sungai Jerneh
Repah (N36)	Repah	133/36/01	SMA Repah; SJK (T) Ladang Repah
Repah (N36)	Kampong Bahru Tampin	133/36/02	SJK (C) Kg Baru Tampin
Repah (N36)	Pekan Tampin	133/36/03	SJK (T) Tampin
Repah (N36)	Kampong Batu Belang	133/36/04	SMK Taman Indah; SK Dr Sulaiman
Repah (N36)	Keru	133/36/05	SK Keru
Repah (N36)	Tebong	136/36/06	SK Tunku Syed Syaaban
Repah (N36)	Kampong Asahan	136/36/07	Maahad Ahmadi Gemencheh
Repah (N36)	Taman Indah	133/36/08	SK Tengku Zainun; SK Tungku Besar Tampin

=== Representation history ===
Members of Parliament for Tampin
Parliament	No	Years	Member	Party	Vote Share
Constituency created from Rembau-Tampin and Jelebu-Jempol
4th	P094	1974–1978	Mokhtar Hashim (مختار هشيم)	BN (UMNO)	Uncontested
5th	P094	1978–1982	Mokhtar Hashim (مختار هشيم)	BN (UMNO)	23,968; 81.13%
6th	P094	1982–1983	Mokhtar Hashim (مختار هشيم)	BN (UMNO)	27,587; 74.05%
6th	P094	1983–1986	Omar Abdullah (عمر عبدالله)	BN (UMNO)	24,761; 80.88%
7th	P105	1986–1990	Mohd. Noh Rajab (محمد. نوه راجب)	BN (UMNO)	21,152; 79.07%
8th	P105	1990–1995	Mohd. Noh Rajab (محمد. نوه راجب)	BN (UMNO)	23,784; 75.07%
9th	P115	1995–1999	Mohd. Noh Rajab (محمد. نوه راجب)	BN (UMNO)	26,127; 85.71%
10th	P115	1999–2004	Shaziman Abu Mansor (شاه عظيمان بن ابو منصور)	BN (UMNO)	21,944; 64.71%
11th	P133	2004–2008	Shaziman Abu Mansor (شاه عظيمان بن ابو منصور)	BN (UMNO)	23,936; 80.35%
12th	P133	2008–2013	Shaziman Abu Mansor (شاه عظيمان بن ابو منصور)	BN (UMNO)	24,022; 68.70%
13th	P133	2013–2018	Shaziman Abu Mansor (شاه عظيمان بن ابو منصور)	BN (UMNO)	29,390; 61.72%
14th	P133	2018–2022	Hasan Bahrom (حسن بهروم)	PH (AMANAH)	22,435; 46.29%
15th	P133	2022–present	Mohd Isam Mohd Isa (محمد عيسىم محمد عيسى)	BN (UMNO)	23,283; 38.15%

=== State constituency ===
Parliamentary constituency	State constituency						
Parliamentary constituency	1955–59*	1959–1974	1974–1986	1986–1995	1995–2004	2004–2018	2018–present
Tampin			Gemas				
Tampin			Gemencheh				
Tampin			Kota				
Tampin				Repah			
Tampin			Rompin				

=== Historical boundaries ===
State Constiteuncy	Area				
State Constiteuncy	1974	1984	1994	2003	2018
Gemas	FELDA Jelai; FELDA Pasir Besar; Gemas; Kampung Londah; Kampung Tiong		FELDA Jelai; FELDA Pasir Besar; FELDA Sungai Kelamah; Gemas; Kampung Tiong		FELDA Jelai; FELDA Pasir Besar; Gemas; Kampung Londah; Kampung Tiong
Gemencheh	Air Kuning Selatan; FELDA Bukit Jalor; Gemencheh; Repah; Tampin	Air Kuning Selatan; FELDA Bukit Jalor; Gemencheh; Kampung Parit Buloh; Kampung Seri Jelai			Air Kuning Selatan; FELDA Bukit Jalor; Gemencheh; Kampung Seri Jelai; Ladang Regent
Kota	Chengkau; Kampung Orang Asli Pabai Miku; Kampung Pulau Hanyut; Kota; Lubuk China				
Repah		Ladang Regent; Orek; Repah; Taman Gunung Mas; Tampin			Kampung Keru; Orek; Repah; Taman Gunung Mas; Tampin
Rompin	FELDA Palong; FELDA Pasir Besar; Ladang Geddes; Rompin; Taman Melor				

=== Current state assembly members ===
No.	State Constituency	Member	Coalition (Party)
N34	Gemas	Ridzuan Ahmad	PN (WAWASAN)
N35	Gemencheh	Suhaimizan Bizar	BN (UMNO)
N36	Repah	Koh Kim Swee	BN (MCA)

=== Local governments & postcodes ===
No.	State Constituency	Local Government	Postcode
N34	Gemas	Tampin District Council	73000 Tampin; 73100 Johol; 73200, 73300 Gememcheh; 73400, 73420, 73480 Gemas; 73500 Rompin
N35	Gemencheh	Tampin District Council	73000 Tampin; 73100 Johol; 73200, 73300 Gememcheh; 73400, 73420, 73480 Gemas; 73500 Rompin
N36	Repah	Tampin District Council	73000 Tampin; 73100 Johol; 73200, 73300 Gememcheh; 73400, 73420, 73480 Gemas; 73500 Rompin

== Election results ==
Malaysian general election, 2022
Party	Candidate	Votes	%	∆%
BN	Mohd Isam Mohd Isa	23,283	38.15	▼6.07
PH	Muhammad Faiz Fadzil	22,007	36.06	▼10.23
PN	Abdul Halim Abu Bakar	14,962	24.51	▲24.51
PEJUANG	Zamani Ibrahim	781	1.28	▲1.28
Total valid votes		61,033	100.00	
Total rejected ballots		781		
Unreturned ballots		146		
Turnout		61,960	75.26	▼6.23
Registered electors		81,099		
Majority		1,276	2.09	▲0.02
BN gain from PH		Swing		?
Source(s) https://lom.agc.gov.my/ilims/upload/portal/akta/outputp/1753263/PUB615%20PARLIMEN%20NEGERI%20SEMBILAN.pdf

Malaysian general election, 2018
Party	Candidate	Votes	%	∆%
PH	Hasan Bahrom	22,435	46.29	▲46.29
BN	Shaziman Abu Mansor	21,433	44.22	▼17.50
PAS	Abdul Razakek Abdul Rahim	4,598	9.49	▼28.79
Total valid votes		48,466	100.00	
Total rejected ballots		850		
Unreturned ballots		199		
Turnout		49,515	81.49	▼3.72
Registered electors		60,765		
Majority		1,002	2.07	▼21.37
PH gain from BN		Swing		?
Source(s) "His Majesty's Government Gazette - Notice of Contested Election, Parliament for the State of Negeri Sembilan [P.U. (B) 242/2018]" (PDF). Attorney General's Chambers of Malaysia. 3 May 2018. "Federal Government Gazette - Results of Contested Election and Statements of the Poll after the Official Addition of Votes, Parliamentary Constituencies for the State of Negeri Sembilan [P.U. (B) 316/2018]" (PDF). Attorney General's Chambers of Malaysia. 28 May 2018.

Malaysian general election, 2013
Party	Candidate	Votes	%	∆%
BN	Shaziman Abu Mansor	29,390	61.72	▼6.98
PAS	Abdul Razakek Abdul Rahim	18,228	38.28	▲6.98
Total valid votes		47,618	100.00	
Total rejected ballots		1,042		
Unreturned ballots		139		
Turnout		48,799	85.21	▲8.97
Registered electors		57,268		
Majority		11,162	23.44	▼13.96
BN hold		Swing		
Source(s) "Federal Government Gazette - Notice of Contested Election, Parliament for the State of Negeri Sembilan [P.U. (B) 179/2013]" (PDF). Attorney General's Chambers of Malaysia. 26 April 2013. Archived from the original (PDF) on 2019-12-29. "Federal Government Gazette - Results of Contested Election and Statements of the Poll after the Official Addition of Votes, Parliamentary Constituencies for the State of Negeri Sembilan [P.U. (B) 220/2013]" (PDF). Attorney General's Chambers of Malaysia. 22 May 2013.

Malaysian general election, 2008
Party	Candidate	Votes	%	∆%
BN	Shaziman Abu Mansor	24,022	68.70	▼11.65
PAS	Abdul Razakek Abdul Rahim	10,943	31.30	▲11.65
Total valid votes		34,965	100.00	
Total rejected ballots		1,115		
Unreturned ballots		251		
Turnout		36,331	76.24	▲2.20
Registered electors		47,655		
Majority		13,079	37.40	▼23.30
BN hold		Swing		

Malaysian general election, 2004
Party	Candidate	Votes	%	∆%
BN	Shaziman Abu Mansor	23,936	80.35	▲15.64
PAS	Abdul Razakek Abdul Rahim	5,852	19.65	▼15.64
Total valid votes		29,788	100.00	
Total rejected ballots		951		
Unreturned ballots		39		
Turnout		30,778	74.04	▲0.04
Registered electors		41,571		
Majority		18,084	60.70	▲31.28
BN hold		Swing		

Malaysian general election, 1999
Party	Candidate	Votes	%	∆%
BN	Shaziman Abu Mansor	21,944	64.71	▼21.00
PAS	Hamdan Hashim	11,965	35.29	▲36.48
Total valid votes		33,909	100.00	
Total rejected ballots		869		
Unreturned ballots		468		
Turnout		35,246	74.00	▼0.41
Registered electors		47,628		
Majority		9,979	29.42	▼47.48
BN hold		Swing		

Malaysian general election, 1995
Party	Candidate	Votes	%	∆%
BN	Mohd. Noh Rajab	26,127	85.71	▲10.64
PAS	Ali Maidin Kutty	2,687	8.81	▲8.81
Independent	S. Omar S. Abdullah	1,672	5.48	▲5.48
Total valid votes		30,486	100.00	
Total rejected ballots		1,454		
Unreturned ballots		290		
Turnout		32,230	73.59	▼3.20
Registered electors		43,797		
Majority		23,440	76.90	▲26.76
BN hold		Swing		

Malaysian general election, 1990
Party	Candidate	Votes	%	∆%
BN	Mohd. Noh Rajab	23,784	75.07	▼4.00
S46	Sulaiman Yusof	7,900	24.93	▲24.93
Total valid votes		31,684	100.00	
Total rejected ballots		1,058		
Unreturned ballots		0		
Turnout		32,742	76.79	▲3.92
Registered electors		42,637		
Majority		15,884	50.14	▼8.00
BN hold		Swing		

Malaysian general election, 1986
Party	Candidate	Votes	%	∆%
BN	Mohd. Noh Rajab	21,152	79.07	▼1.81
DAP	Heng Kaw @ Yee Kong	5,599	20.93	▲20.93
Total valid votes		26,751	100.00	
Total rejected ballots		1,134		
Unreturned ballots		0		
Turnout		27,885	72.87	▲10.75
Registered electors		38,268		
Majority		15,553	58.14	▼1.86
BN hold		Swing		

Malaysian general by-election, 24 September 1983 The by-election was called due to the disqualification of incumbent, Mokhtar Hashim after being found guilty of murder.
Party	Candidate	Votes	%	∆%
BN	Omar Abdullah	24,761	80.88	▲6.83
PAS	Mansoor Keliwan	3,085	10.08	▲1.85
Independent	Liew Cheong Wai	2,768	9.04	▲9.04
Total valid votes		30,614	100.00	
Total rejected ballots		578		
Unreturned ballots		0		
Turnout		31,170	62.12	▼15.81
Registered electors		50,180		
Majority		21,676	70.00	▲13.67
BN hold		Swing		

Malaysian general election, 1982
Party	Candidate	Votes	%	∆%
BN	Mokhtar Hashim	27,587	74.05	▼7.08
DAP	Loo Ah Man @ Loo Ming Chai	6,603	17.72	▲17.72
PAS	Azahari Hamzah	3,065	8.23	▼10.64
Total valid votes		37,255	100.00	
Total rejected ballots		1,126		
Unreturned ballots		0		
Turnout		38,381	77.93	▼0.97
Registered electors		49,248		
Majority		20,984	56.33	▼5.93
BN hold		Swing		

Malaysian general election, 1978
Party	Candidate	Votes	%	∆%
BN	Mokhtar Hashim	23,968	81.13	▲81.13
PAS	Mohd Ali Napiah Ismail	5,575	18.87	▲18.87
Total valid votes		29,543	100.00	
Total rejected ballots		1,742		
Unreturned ballots		0		
Turnout		23,478	78.90	
Registered electors		39,535		
Majority		18,393	62.26	
BN hold		Swing		

Malaysian general election, 1974
Party	Candidate	Votes	%
On the nomination day, Mokhtar Hashim won uncontested.
BN	Mokhtar Hashim		
Total valid votes			100.00
Total rejected ballots			
Unreturned ballots			
Turnout			
Registered electors		31,889	
Majority			
This was a new constituency created.
