= Tampin District =

District in Negeri Sembilan, Malaysia

- District of Negeri Sembilan
- Daerah Tampin
- Seal

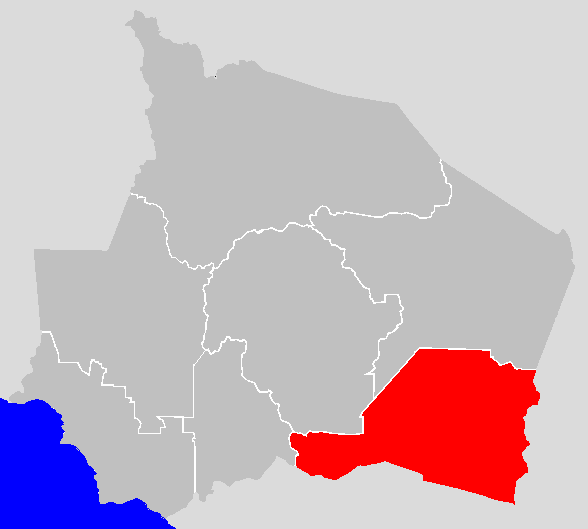
- Location of Tampin District in Negeri Sembilan
- Interactive map of Tampin District
- Location of Tampin District in Malaysia
- Coordinates: 2°30′N 102°25′E
- Country: Malaysia
- State: Negeri Sembilan
- Established as District: 1 July 1980
- Seat: Tampin
- Local area government(s): Tampin District Council

Government
  - District officer: Mohamed Roduan Ujang
  - Tunku Besar Tampin: Tunku Syed Razman al-Qadri

Area
  - Total: 878.69 km^{2} (339.26 sq mi)

Population (2020)
  - Total: 88,101
  - Density: 100.26/km^{2} (259.68/sq mi)
- Time zone: UTC+8 (MST)
  - Summer (DST): UTC+8 (Not observed)
- Postcode: 73xxx
- Calling code: +6-06
- Vehicle registration plates: N

The Tampin District is a district in Negeri Sembilan, Malaysia. The district covers 878.69 square kilometres (339.26 sq mi) and is further divided into four adat socio-political provinces (luaks): Tampin Adat Territory (which includes the town of Tampin), Ayer Kuning, Gemencheh and Pasir Besar.

Tampin District is surrounded by Tangkak and Segamat Districts, Johor to the southwest, Jasin and Alor Gajah Districts, Malacca to the south, Rembau District to the west, Kuala Pilah District to the northwest and Jempol District to the north. The geographical southern terminus of the Titiwangsa Mountains, the longest mountain range in Malaysia, is located in this district.

== Administrative divisions ==

Tampin District is divided into 7 mukims, which are:

- Ayer Kuning
- Gemas
- Gemencheh
- Keru
- Repah
- Tampin Tengah
- Tebong

From the perspective of the adat, the district is governed separately by two different entities, where the mukims of Tampin Tengah, Repah, Keru and Tebong comprises the semi-autonomous Tampin Adat Territory governed by the Tunku Besar of Tampin, and the luaks of Gemencheh, Ayer Kuning and Pasir Besar (which includes Gemas) are protectorates of the Luak of Johol.

== Demographics ==
Historical population
Year	Pop.	±%
1991	72,295	—
2000	77,021	+6.5%
2010	82,165	+6.7%
2020	88,101	+7.2%

== Federal Parliament and State Assembly Seats ==
List of Tampin district representatives in the Federal Parliament (Dewan Rakyat)

Parliament	Seat Name	Member of Parliament	Party
P133	Tampin	Mohd Isam Mohd Isa	Barisan Nasional (UMNO)

List of Tampin district representatives in the State Legislative Assembly (Dewan Undangan Negeri)

Parliament	State	Seat Name	State Assemblyman	Party
P133	N34	Gemas	Ridzuan Ahmad	Perikatan Nasional (WAWASAN)
P133	N35	Gemencheh	Suhaimizan Bizar	Barisan Nasional (UMNO)
P133	N36	Repah	Koh Kim Swee	Barisan Nasional (MCA)
