= Tampin (town) =

- Town and district capital
- Tampin Town; Bandar Tampin
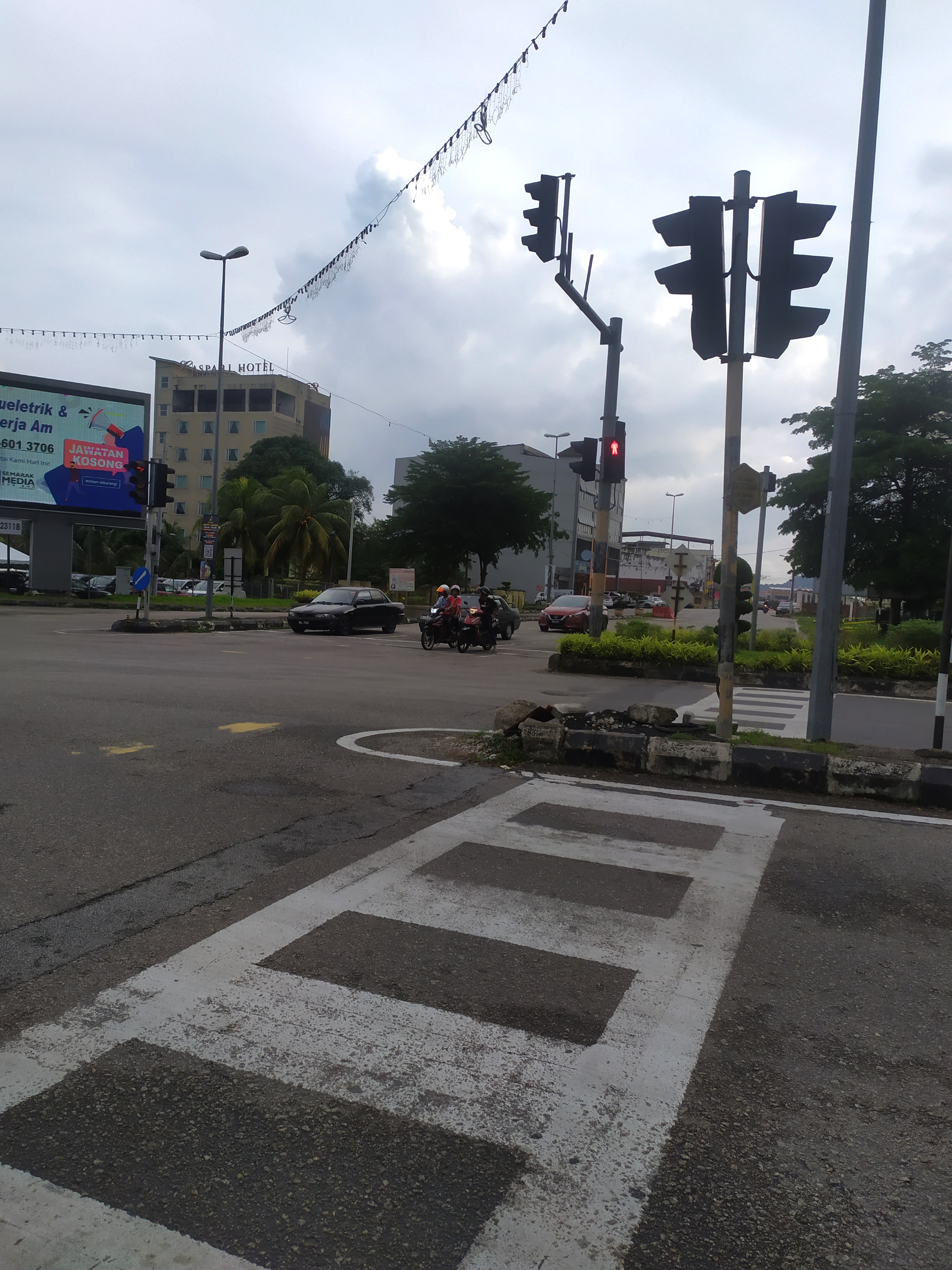
- Downtown Tampin

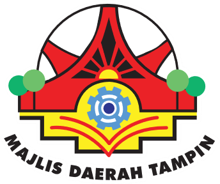
- Logo
- Motto: Tampin Indah Bersih Selamat (Tampin Beautiful Clean Safe)
- Interactive map of Tampin
- Coordinates: 2°28′22″N 102°13′55″E
- Country: Malaysia
- State: Negeri Sembilan
- District: Tampin
- Luak: Tampin Adat Territory
- Established: 1840

Government
  - Type: District council
  - Body: Tampin District Council
  - President: Suriani Binti Salihan
  - MP: Mohd Isam Mohd Isa (BN–UMNO)
  - MLA: Koh Kim Swee (BN–MCA)

Area
  - Total: 149 km^{2} (58 sq mi)
- Elevation: 79 m (259 ft)

Population (2020)
  - Total: 31,984
  - Density: 215/km^{2} (556/sq mi)
- Time zone: UTC+8 (MST)
- Postcode: 73xxx
- Website: Tampin District Council
- Note: The population and land area data of the state constituency of Repah is taken as the population and town area of Tampin, as the Tampin town area is wholly situated within Repah.

Tampin is a town in Tampin District, Negeri Sembilan, Malaysia, which borders Pulau Sebang town in Alor Gajah District, Malacca. It is situated at the southern tip of the longest mountain range in Malaysia, the Titiwangsa Mountains.

Tampin is located around 60 km south of the state capital city of Seremban and 30 km northwest of Malacca City, Malacca. The local authority responsible for the town is the Tampin District Council (Malay: Majlis Daerah Tampin).

== Toponymy ==
Tampin gets its name from the container or pouch weaved from the pandanus fronds. The container was used to store condiments such as the sticky dessert kelamai or dodol and the shrimp paste belacan. The Tampin Adat Territory, a specific subdivision within the district of the same name that also encompasses the town is also known as Luak Tampin, with luak being the local term for a territory, area or district.

== History ==
Tampin
- Semi-autonomous luak
- Adat Territory of Tampin; Wilayah Adat Tampin
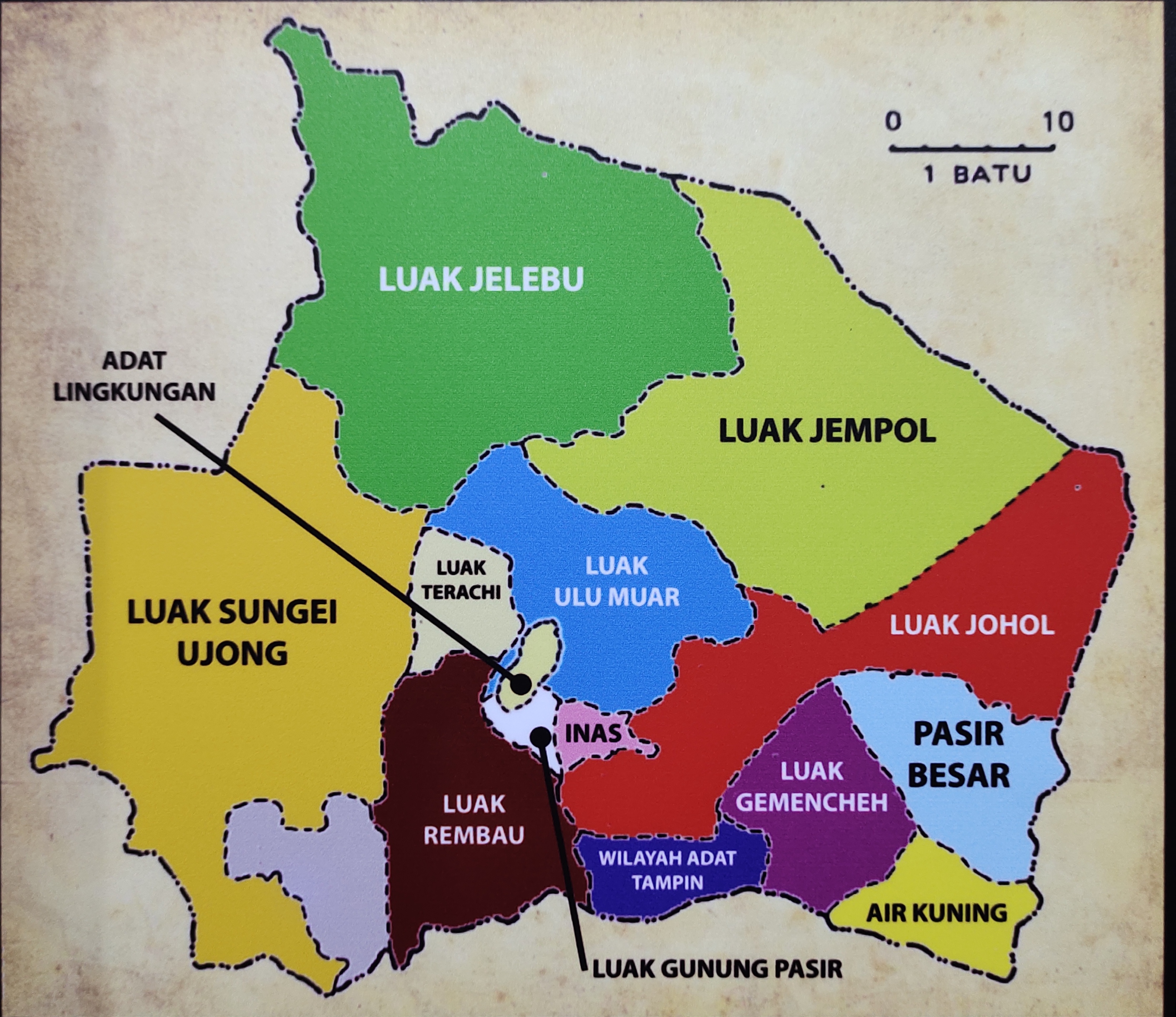
- The Tampin Adat Territory relative to other luaks in Negeri Sembilan
- Country: Malaysia
- State: Negeri Sembilan
- Adat institution: Tunku Besar Tampin

Government
  - Tunku Besar Tampin: Razman al-Qadri

Tampin was originally part of Luak of Rembau. After the Naning War in 1832, Raja Ali declared himself the ruler of Seri Menanti and his son-in-law, Syed Shaaban, as the ruler of Rembau. This enraged other rulers of Negeri Sembilan as they had no right to the posts. In 1834 a civil war ensued, which resulted in Raja Ali and Syed Shaaban retreating to Tampin and the area from Mount Tampin to Bukit Putus being removed from Rembau. The provinces of Repah, Keru, Tebong and Tampin Tengah formed the district known as Tampin. Syed Shaaban became the first ruler of Tampin and proclaimed himself the title Tunku Besar Tampin. The district is one of the original confederation of nine states collectively known as Negeri Sembilan, which literally mean "Nine States" in Malay.

On 11 March 1889, the Governor of the Straits Settlements, Sir Cecil Smith, held a meeting with the rulers of Jelebu, Sungai Ujong, Rembau, Seri Menanti and Tampin. The purpose of this meeting was to combine the districts to better manage them under British rule. Tampin, Rembau and Seri Menanti agreed to the proposal and were united as the Seri Menanti Confederation. The newly formed confederation accepted Martin Lister as its first British Resident.

At least as late as November 1933, customs control once existed at the Negeri Sembilan-Malacca boundary, where goods passing through the boundary from both sides may be subjected to customs inspection and duties imposed by the Federated Malay States government. There were at least two customs gates erected in Tampin, one at the main street of Tampin (Jalan Besar), while the other at Kendong. After World War II, customs control between the states was abolished.

After the independence of Malaya in 1957, Negeri Sembilan and its districts started forming local administrative councils. Formerly known as the Tampin Town Board, the Tampin District Council was established on 1 July 1980, as a result of a restructure of the state via the Local Government Act 1976.

== Politics ==
Tampin is a parliamentary constituency in the Dewan Rakyat of the Malaysian Parliament. The current Member of Parliament since the 2022 Malaysian general election is Mohd Isam Mohd Isa, an UMNO member under Barisan Nasional. The previous Member of Parliament for Tampin between 2018 and 2022 is Hasan Bahrom, an AMANAH member under the Pakatan Harapan coalition.

In turn, Tampin District provides 3 seats to the Negeri Sembilan State Legislative Assembly, namely Gemas, Gemencheh and Repah. The town itself is located within the state constituency of Repah, which is held by a DAP member, Veerapan Superamaniam, since 2008.

== Public facilities ==
=== Healthcare ===
==== Tampin Hospital ====
The Tampin Hospital is the only government hospital in Tampin, currently located at a 50 acres (20 ha) compound off Jalan Tampin-Gemas (Federal Route 1). The hospital has 108 beds for patient as of 2013. It mainly serves the residents of the Tampin District. However, it also serves some of the residents from nearby districts such as Rembau, Kuala Pilah and Alor Gajah.

The hospital was first established in 1920 at a 6 acres (2.4 ha) site near the Tampin Recreational Park at Jalan Kelab. The old hospital would operated for 93 years until 2013. In 2010, a fire broke out at the hospital, but no casualties were reported. In 2013, Tampin Hospital moved to its current location after the new hospital complex constructed under the 9th Malaysia Plan was completed. The old hospital was then handed over to Negeri Sembilan Health Department, Tampin District Health Office and Tampin District Dental Office.

In 2021, majority of the old hospital buildings was demolished to make way for the construction of a new government health clinic, which aims to replace the existing overcapacity Tampin District Health Clinic. Only two original buildings remained at the site, which currently houses the Tampin District Dental Clinic.

==== Tampin District Health Clinic ====
The Tampin District Health Clinic is a Type-3 government health clinic located between the Tampin Hospital compound and the Tampin District Health Office, off Jalan Tampin-Gemas. The clinic was built at its current site in the 1980s or 1990s. It has the capacity of treating 600 to 800 patients per day as of 2018. On 21 June 2018, a fire broke out at the clinic's pharmacy unit, in which RM490,000 was spent to repair the damages.

An application to move and upgrade the clinic has been made by the Negeri Sembilan Health Department to the federal government in 2016, and the new clinic is slated to be built at the old Tampin Hospital site with an estimated cost of RM45 million, which will be a Type-2 government health clinic and has the capacity of handling 1,000 patients per day.

=== Police station ===
The main police station responsible for the town is the Tampin Police Station, which sits on a 2.012 acres (0.814 ha) site at Jalan Besar Tampin. It also serves the Tampin District Police Headquarters, in which the police stations in Tampin, Gemencheh, Gemas, and Air Kuning Selatan are under its command. The police station was built in 1932, but police presence has been established in Tampin before that. The Tampin Police Station currently has a manpower of 388 policemen as of 2022.

The police also has two office buildings located at the intersection in front of Kampung Baru Tampin, separate from the main police station at Jalan Besar Tampin. It houses the traffic police, commercial crime, and narcotics divisions of the Tampin Police Station. The two buildings were initially built in the late 1970s to serve as police living quarters, but were abandoned in the late 1990s. The buildings were then refurbished again in the 2000s to serve as administrative offices for the police.

== Transport ==
=== Road link ===
Tampin is well served by the Malaysian transport system. By car it is accessible by either North–South Expressway using the Simpang Ampat exit in neighbouring Malacca, or using Federal Route 1 which connects Tampin to Seremban and Johor Bahru. This town is also linked to Alor Gajah and Malacca City via Federal Route 61. Tampin is also the southern end of Federal Route 9 which begins in Karak in the east coast state of Pahang. Motorists from Malacca are thus able to access the East Coast Expressway to get to Kuantan or Kuala Terengganu while bypassing Kuala Lumpur.

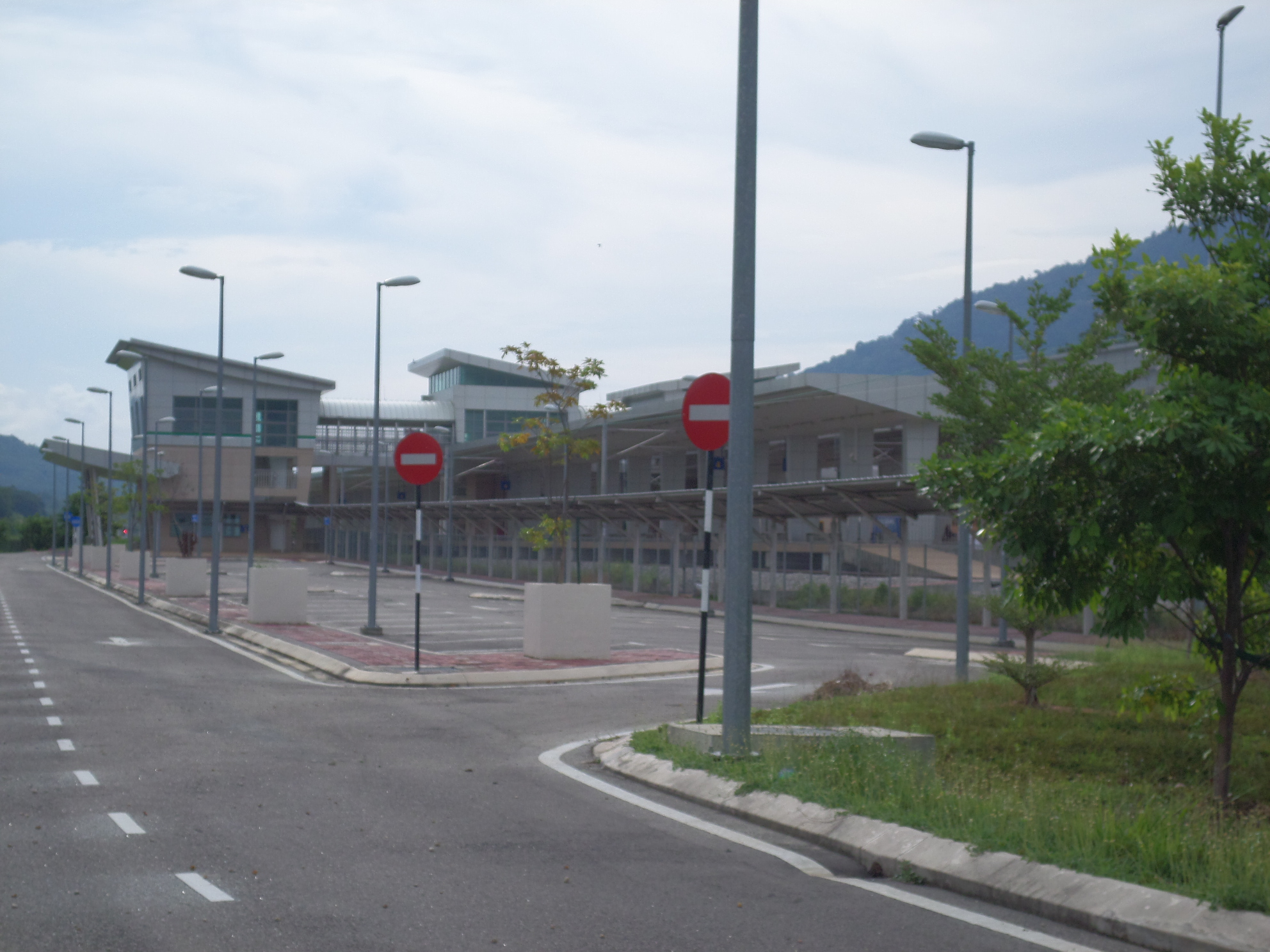
Pulau Sebang-Tampin railway station, the southern terminus of the Seremban Line.

=== Railway ===
In terms of public transport, Tampin is served by the KTMB railway since 1905. In fact, Gemas, which is part of Tampin district, is the meeting point of Peninsular Malaysia's eastern and western railway lines. The Pulau Sebang/Tampin railway station is in Pulau Sebang, which is on the Malaccan side, about 1 kilometer from the town centre.

Since Malacca City does not have a railway station, people living in Malacca normally have to travel to this station in order to get on a train. There was a branch line from Pulau Sebang to Malacca City before World War II, but it was dismantled by the Japanese Imperial Army during the war for the construction of the infamous Burmese Death Railway. It was never rebuilt.

=== Bus and taxi ===
Tampin was also once served by the Tampin Bus Terminal (also known as Pulau Sebang Bus Terminal), which is located between Jalan Perhentian Bas 1 and Jalan Perhentian Bas 2 near the Malacca-Negeri Sembilan border. The two-stories high terminal building for buses and taxis was constructed in the 1980s, but the site has been functioning as a bus terminal before that, with only a simple wooden hut serving as the terminal.

The old bus terminal had officially ceased operation on 1 June 2025, and moved to the Pulau Sebang Sentral bus terminal, located near the Pulau Sebang/Tampin railway station. The site of the old bus terminal was handed over to Yenzoo (M) Sdn Bhd following a land swap deal between Yenzoo and the Malaccan government.

== Demographics ==
Ethnicities within Tampin (N.36 Repah) in 2020
Ethnicities / Nationality	Percentage
Chinese	43.5%
Bumiputera	39.2%
Indian	16.9%
Others	0.3%
Non-Malaysians	1.3%

The town of Tampin is wholly situated within the Repah state constituency, which had a population of 31,984 in 2020. Tampin is a Chinese-plurality town, with the Chinese community forming the largest ethnic group at 43%. The Bumiputeras make up 39%, while the Indian community is notably accounting close to 17%, contributing to a notably diverse and balanced ethnic structure. However no single group holds an absolute majority.

== Education ==
There are 6 government elementary schools and 4 government secondary schools located in or near the main town area of Tampin. Schools that located outside of the state border of Negeri Sembilan are not included in the list.

=== Elementary schools ===
- SJK(C) Kampung Baru Tampin
- SJK(C) Chung Hua
- SJK(T) Tampin
- SK Dr Sulaiman
- SK Tengku Zainun
- SK Tunku Besar Tampin

=== Secondary schools ===
- SMA Repah Tampin
- SMK Taman Indah
- SMK Tunku Besar Tampin
- SMK Tunku Syed Idrus (formerly SMK Tampin)

== Gallery ==
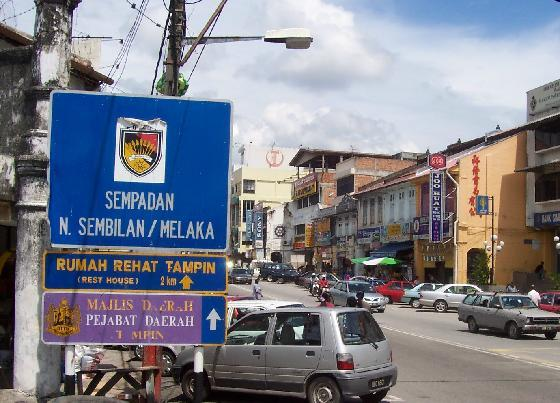
State border signboard between Tampin and Pulau Sebang (2008)

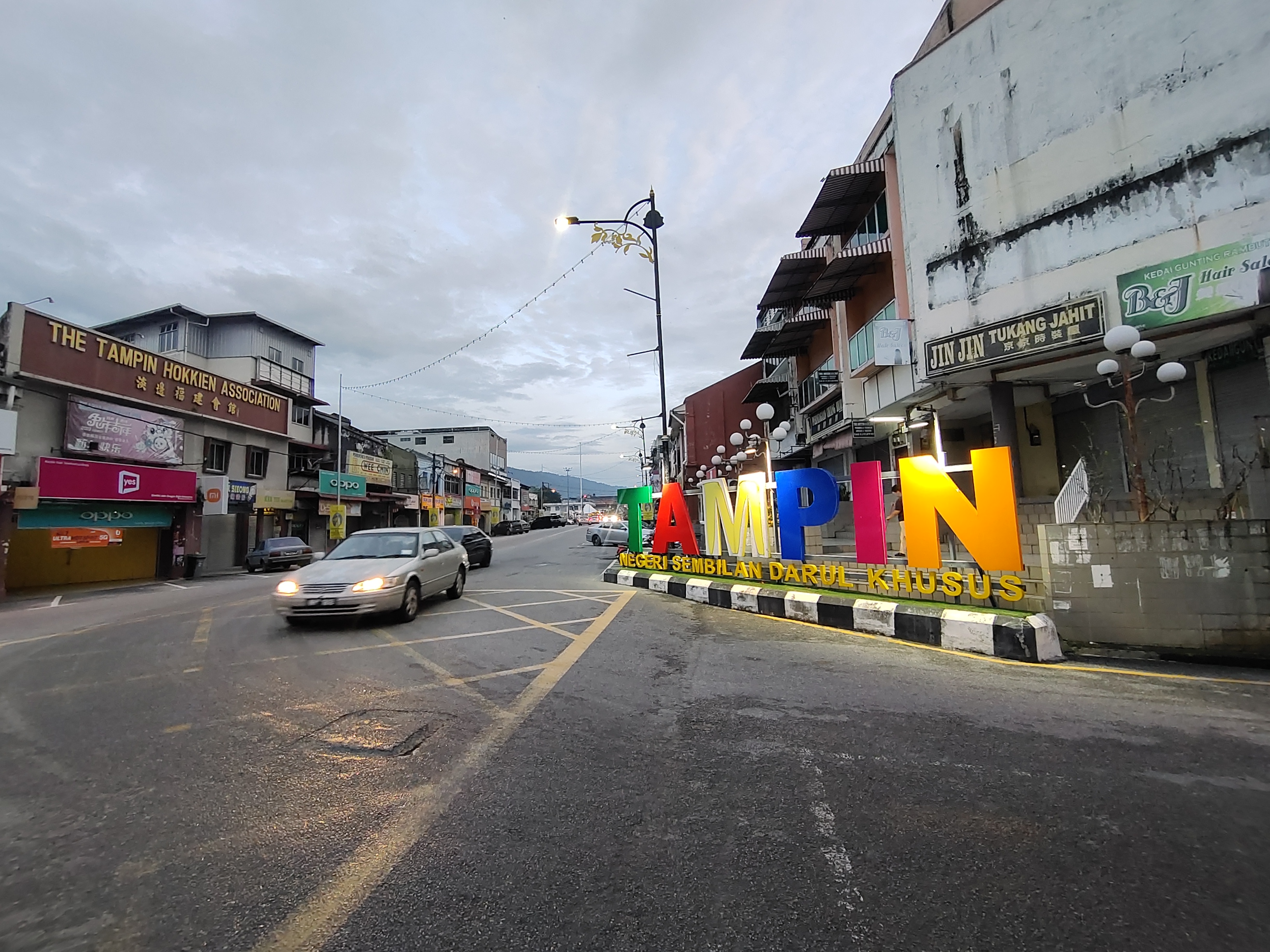
Downtown Tampin, seen from the Malaccan side

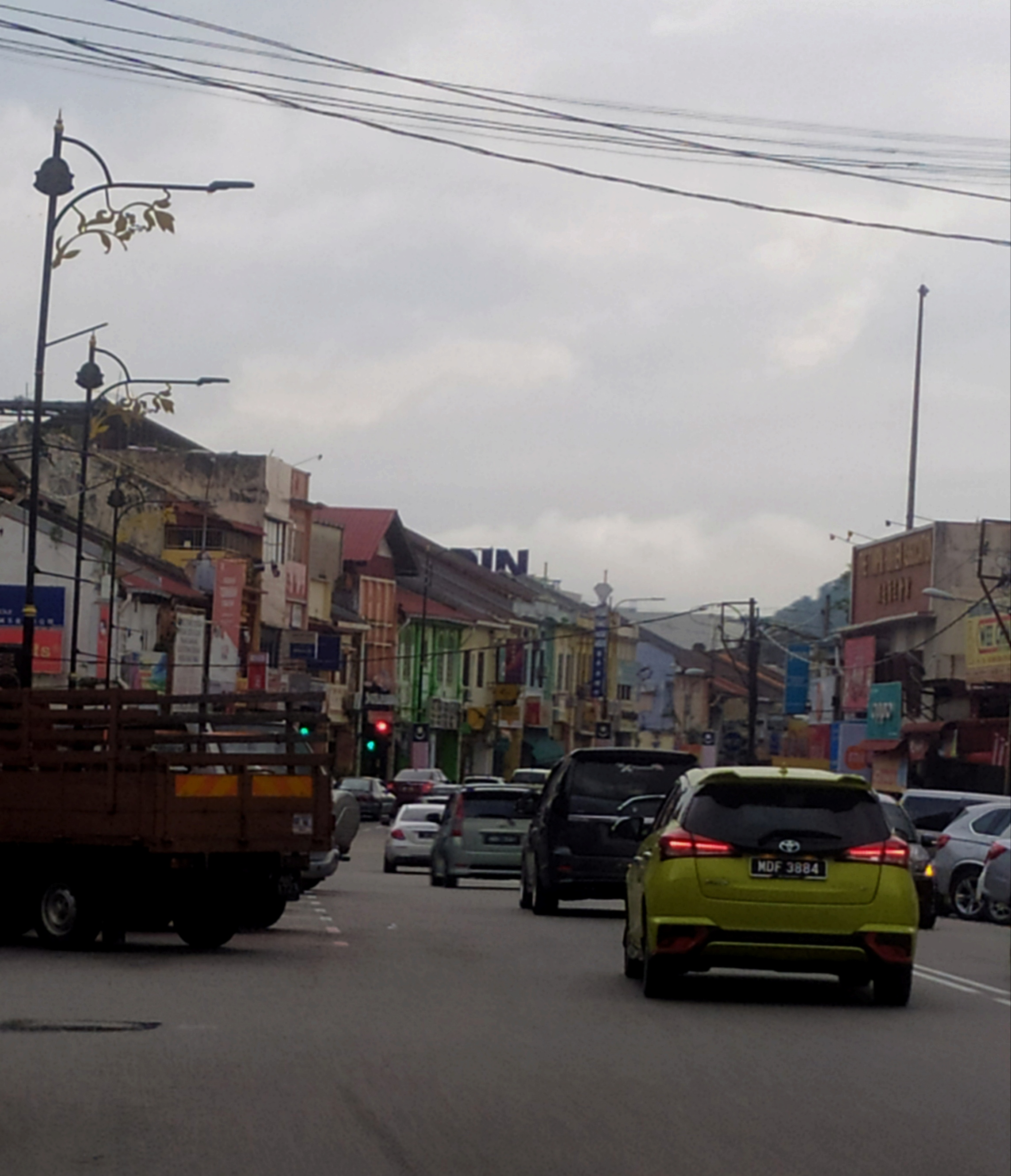
The state border (marked by traffic lights) amidst a busy traffic, seen from the Negri side

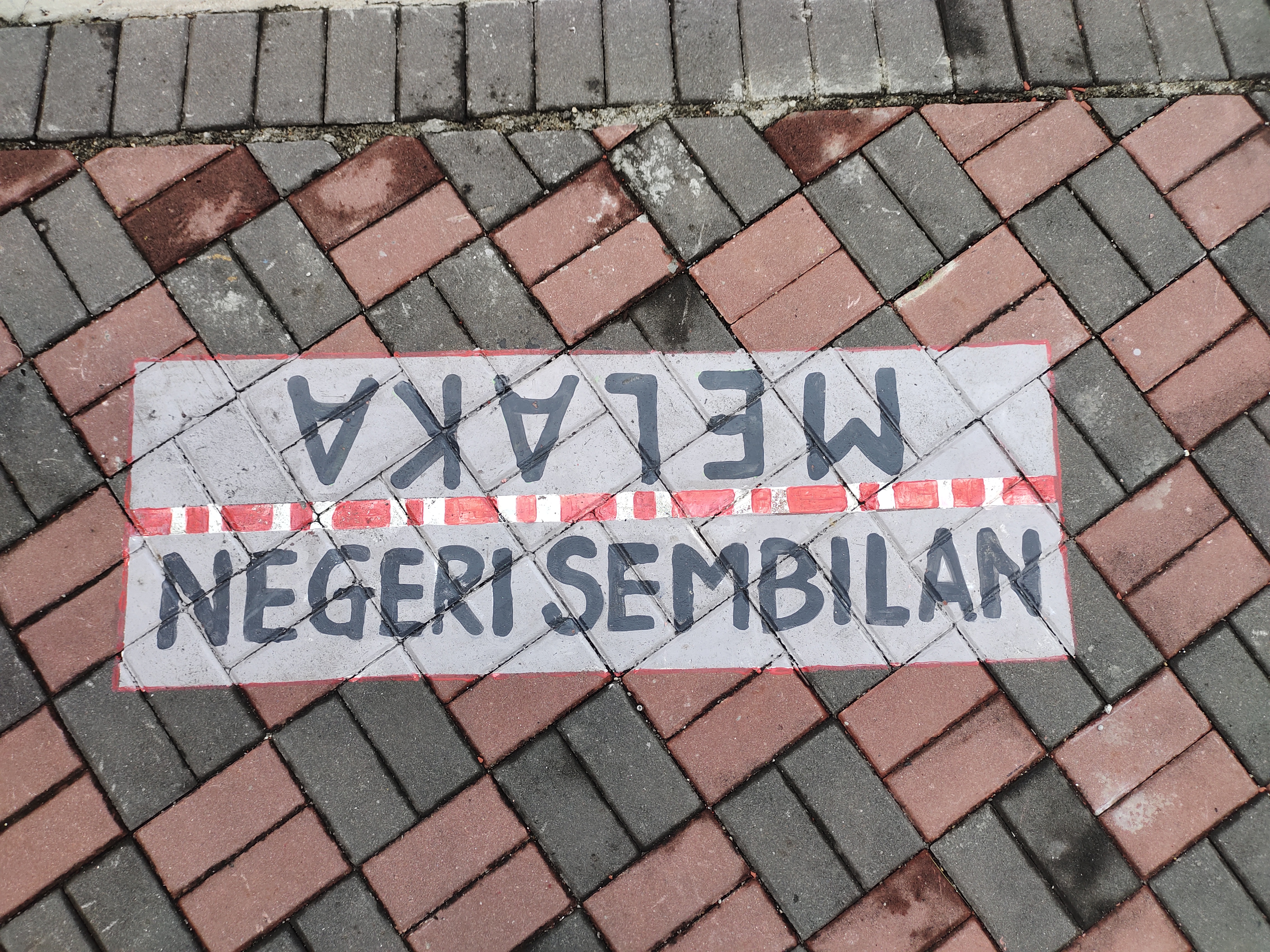
State boundary line drawn on the pavement

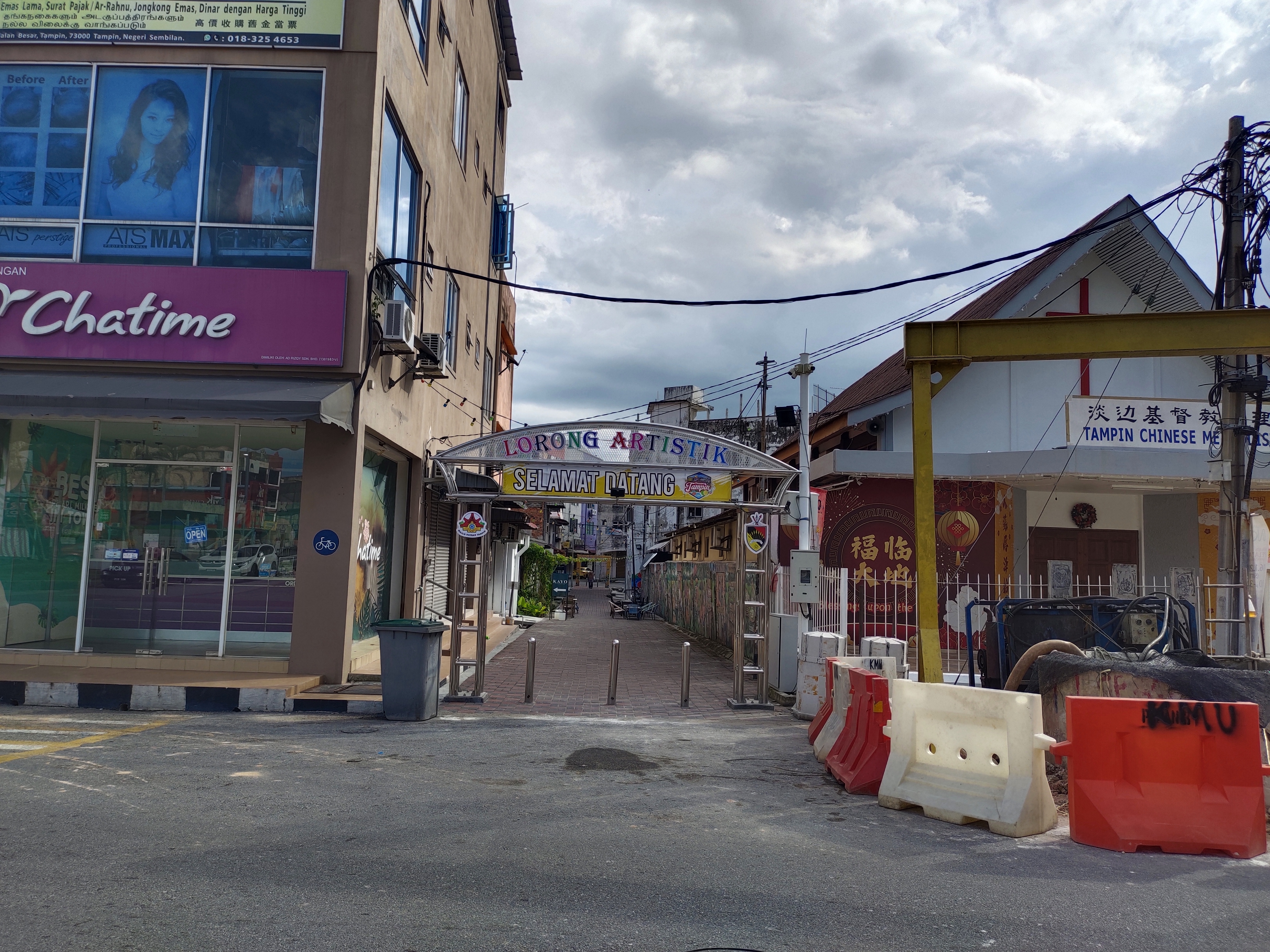
Artistic Alley, downtown Tampin

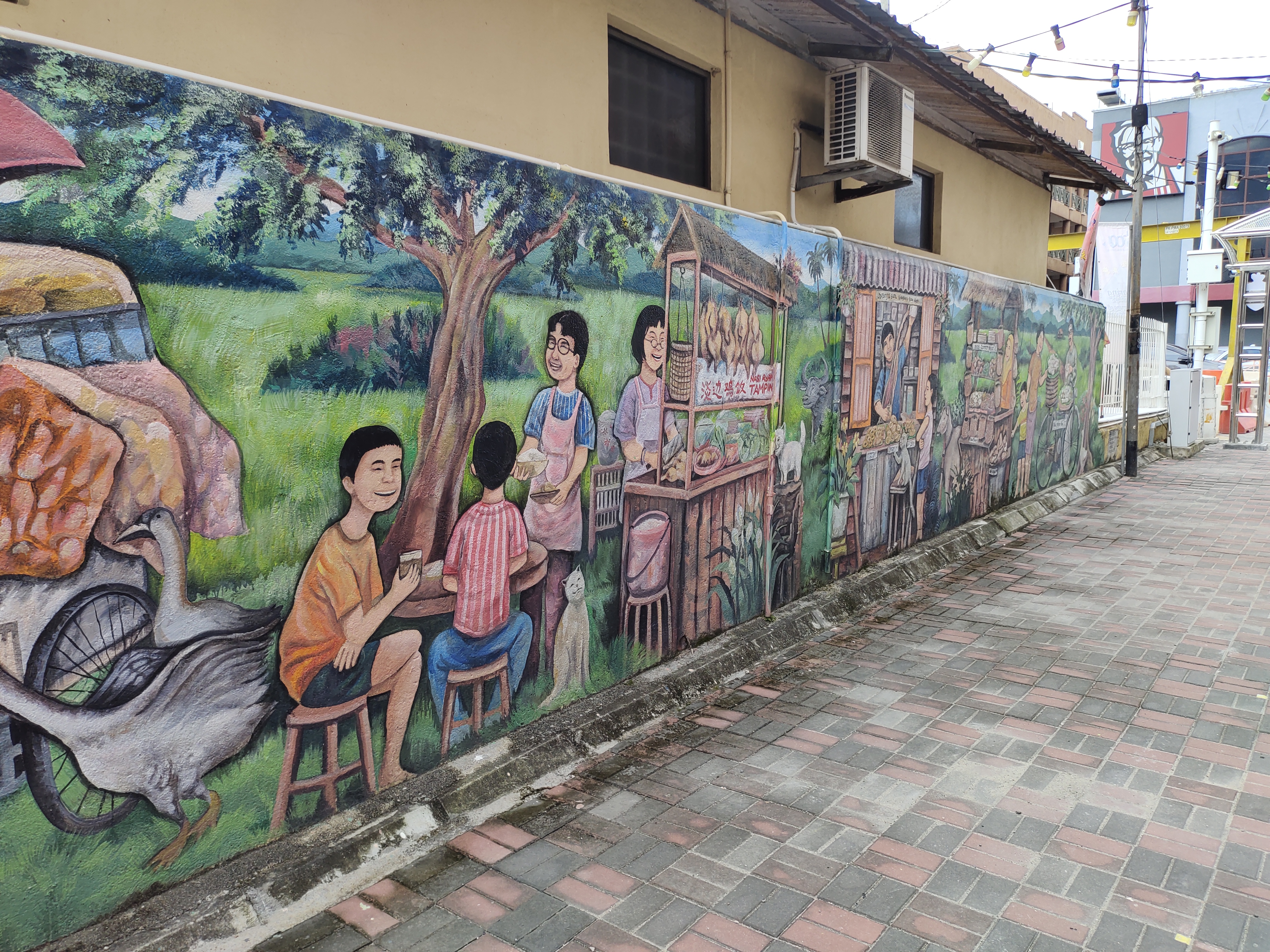
Mural art depicting local culture, Artistic Alley

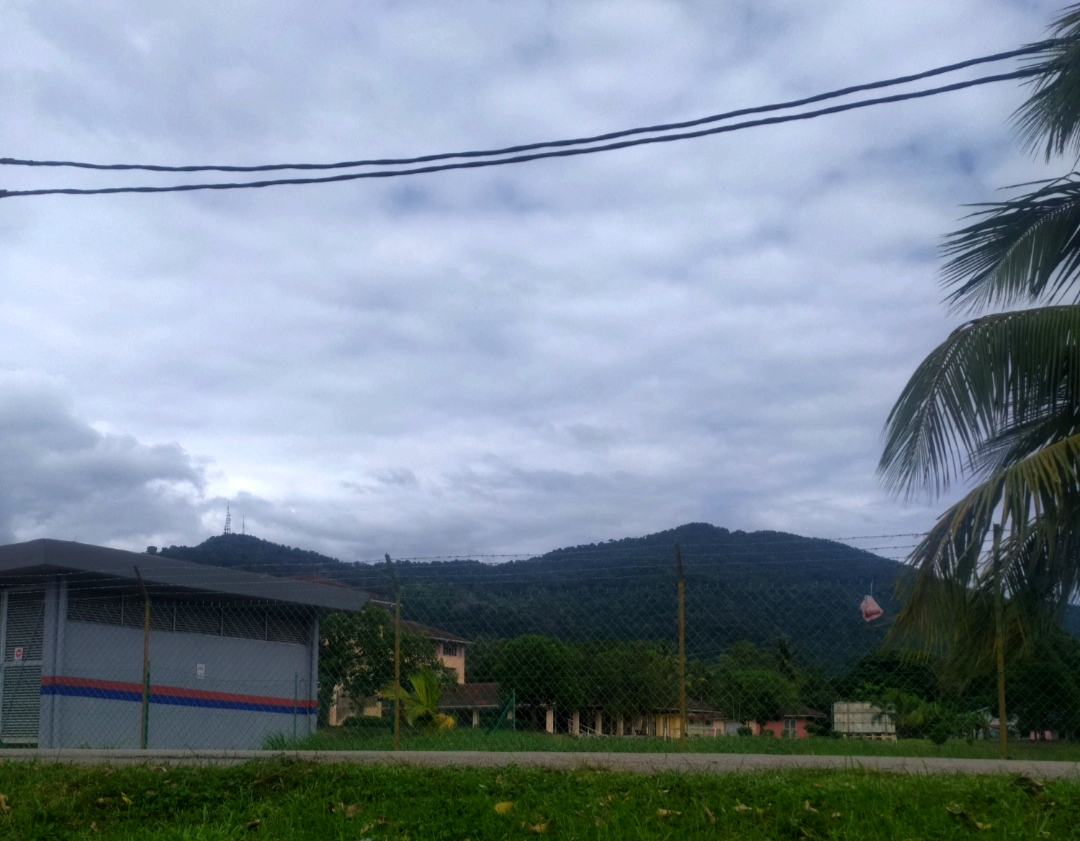
Mount Tampin, the Stadtberg of the town, is the southern end of the Titiwangsa Mountains

== See also ==
- Pulau Sebang
- Batang Melaka
