= Mokhtar Hashim =

Malaysian politician (1942–2020)

Ministerial roles
- 1973–1974: Parliamentary Secretary of Culture, Youth and Sports
- 1974–1976: Deputy Minister of Agriculture and Rural Development
- 1976–1978: Deputy Minister of Defence
- 1978–1980: Deputy Minister of Foreign Affairs
- 1980–1983: Minister of Culture, Youth and Sports

Faction represented in Dewan Rakyat
- 1972–1974: Alliance Party
- 1974–1983: Barisan Nasional

Personal details
- Born: 1 May 1942 Negeri Sembilan, Japanese Malaya
- Died: 18 November 2020 (aged 78) Ampang Hospital, Kuala Lumpur, Malaysia
- Resting place: Bukit Kiara Muslim Cemetery, Kuala Lumpur
- Citizenship: Malaysian
- Party: United Malays National Organisation (UMNO)
- Other political affiliations: Barisan Nasional; Alliance

Mokhtar bin Hashim (1 May 1942 – 18 November 2020) was a Malaysian politician who served as the Minister of Culture, Youth and Sports (1980–1983). He was convicted for the 1982 murder of a rival politician, Negeri Sembilan Assembly Speaker Taha Talib, but the death sentence was commuted to life imprisonment. He was ultimately granted a royal pardon in 1991.

== Background ==
Mokhtar Hashim was educated at the Malay College Kuala Kangsar. In 1972, after winning the Rembau-Tampin parliamentary seat, he was appointed as the Parliamentary Secretary to the Minister of Culture, Youth, and Sports. At that time, Datuk Hamzah Abu Samah was the Minister of Culture, Youth, and Sports.

On 12 November 1974, he was appointed as the Deputy Minister of Agriculture and Rural Development.

== Murder ==
The murder took place in Kampung Seri Asahan, Gemencheh, Negeri Sembilan at 1:30 AM on 14 April 1982. Datuk Mokhtar Hashim was arrested at his home on Jalan 16/6, Petaling Jaya at 1:30 AM. At that time, the 1982 Malaysian general election was just 8 days away, scheduled for 22 April 1982. The motive stemmed from the two being political rivals within the Tampin UMNO Division, where they were vying for power against each other.

Other individuals involved included Rahmat Satiman (46 years old - village head), Nordin Johan (33 years old - businessman), Aziz Abdullah (65 years old - self-employed, Aziz PJK), and Aziz Tumpuk. However, Mokhtar Hashim's supporters were released.

The 75-day trial took place in 1983 at the Kuala Lumpur High Court. On 6 March 1983, Judge Tan Sri Hashim Yeop Abdullah Sani handed down the death sentence. The defense counsel for Mokhtar Hashim was Jagjit Singh. A Felda settler who was supposed to be an alibi witness failed to appear during the trial. The police chief who investigated the case was Musa Hassan.

There were no witnesses who saw Mokhtar Hashim at the rubber plantation during the full moon. However, ballistics tests conducted on the pistol and bullets clearly showed that they belonged to Mokhtar Hashim. Most members of parliament kept pistols for their personal safety.

== Released from Court ==
The death sentence was later commuted to life imprisonment. Datuk Mokhtar Hashim was released from prison on 10 July 1991, after receiving a royal pardon. He was welcomed by his wife and daughter.

== Death ==
Hashim passed away on 18 November 2020 at 3:10 AM at Ampang Hospital and was laid to rest at the Bukit Kiara Islamic Cemetery at 12:30 PM.

== Election results ==
Parliament of Malaysia
Year	Constituency	Candidate	Votes	Pct	Opponent(s)	Votes	Pct	Ballots cast	Majority	Turnout%
1972	P081 Rembau-Tampin, Negeri Sembilan	Mokhtar Hashim (UMNO)	13,228	63.81%	Tengku Jaril Tengku Sulaiman (PAS)	4,018	19.38%	21,101	9,210	N/A
1972	P081 Rembau-Tampin, Negeri Sembilan	Mokhtar Hashim (UMNO)	13,228	63.81%	Muhamed Sharif Harun (DAP)	3,483	16.80%	21,101	9,210	N/A
1974	P094 Tampin, Negeri Sembilan	Mokhtar Hashim (UMNO)	None	None	Unopposed					
1978	P094 Tampin, Negeri Sembilan	Mokhtar Hashim (UMNO)	23,968	81.13%	Mohd Ali Napiah Ismail (PAS)	5,575	18.87%	N/A	18,393	N/A
1982	P094 Tampin, Negeri Sembilan	Mokhtar Hashim (UMNO)	27,587	74.05%	Loo Ah Man @ Loo Ming Chai (DAP)	6,603	17.72%	38,381	20,981	77.93%
1982	P094 Tampin, Negeri Sembilan	Mokhtar Hashim (UMNO)	27,587	74.05%	Azahari Hamzah (PAS)	3,065	8.23%	38,381	20,981	77.93%
