= MRSM Gemencheh =

Secondary school in Negeri Sembilan, Malaysia

Maktab Rendah Sains MARA Gemencheh, commonly known as MRSM Gemencheh, is a secondary school in Tampin District, Negeri Sembilan, Malaysia.

MRSM Gemencheh is part of the Ulul Albab Programme.
