= Gemas =

Town in Negeri Sembilan, Malaysia

Gemas Gomeh (Negeri Sembilan Malay)
- Town and mukim
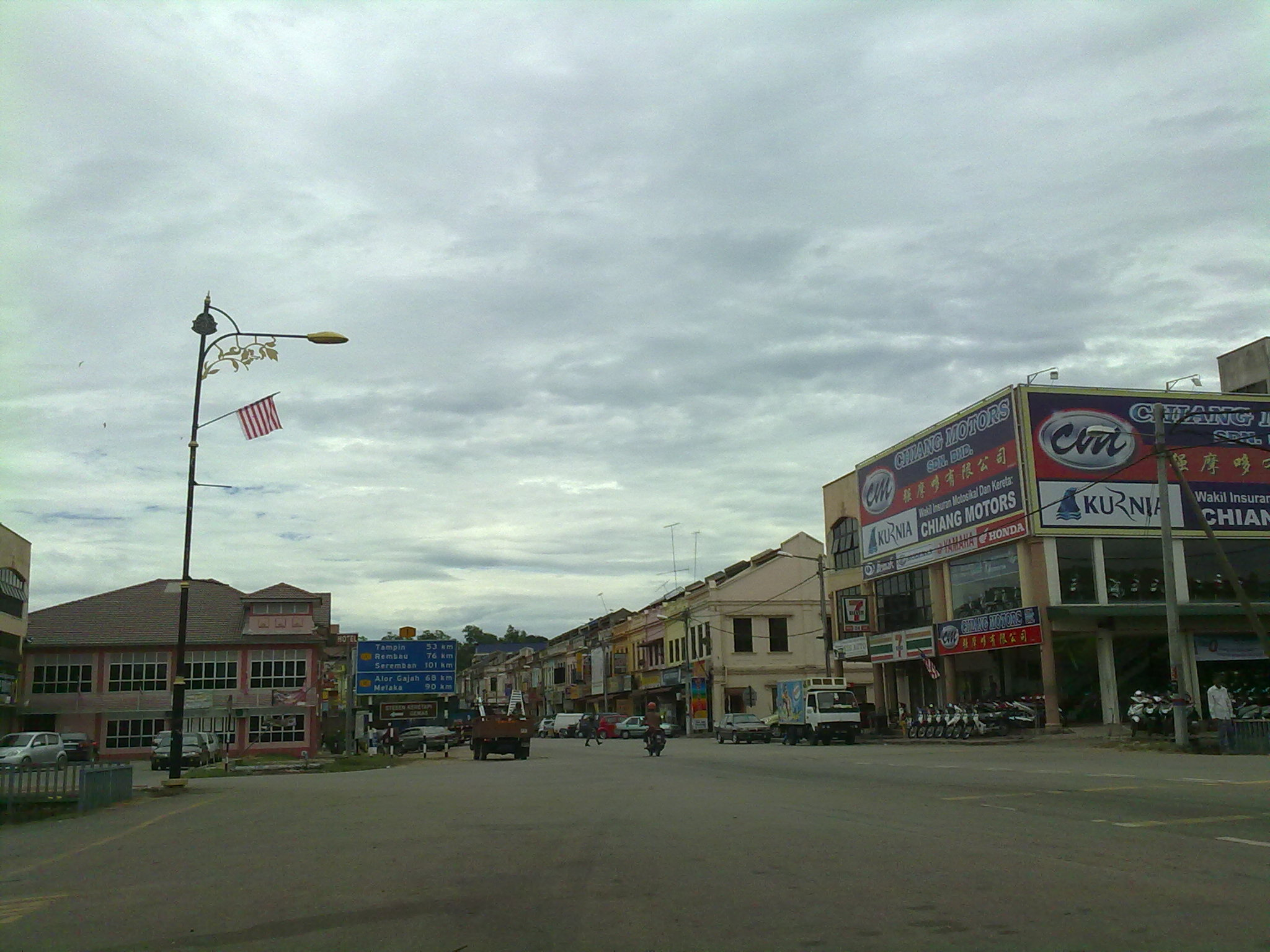
- Federal Route 1 passes through Gemas town centre, on the Negri side.
- Interactive map of Gemas
- Coordinates: 2°35′N 102°35′E
- Country: Malaysia
- State: Negeri Sembilan
- District: Tampin
- Luak: Pasir Besar

Government
  - Body: Tampin District Council
  - President: Suriati Salihan
  - MP: Mohd Isam Mohd Isa (BN–UMNO)
  - MLA: Ridzuan Ahmad (PN–WAWASAN)

Population (2010)
  - Total: 29,777
  - Demonym: Gemasian
- Time zone: UTC+8 (MST)
  - Summer (DST): Not observed
- Postal code: 73400
- National calling code: 07

Gemas sign

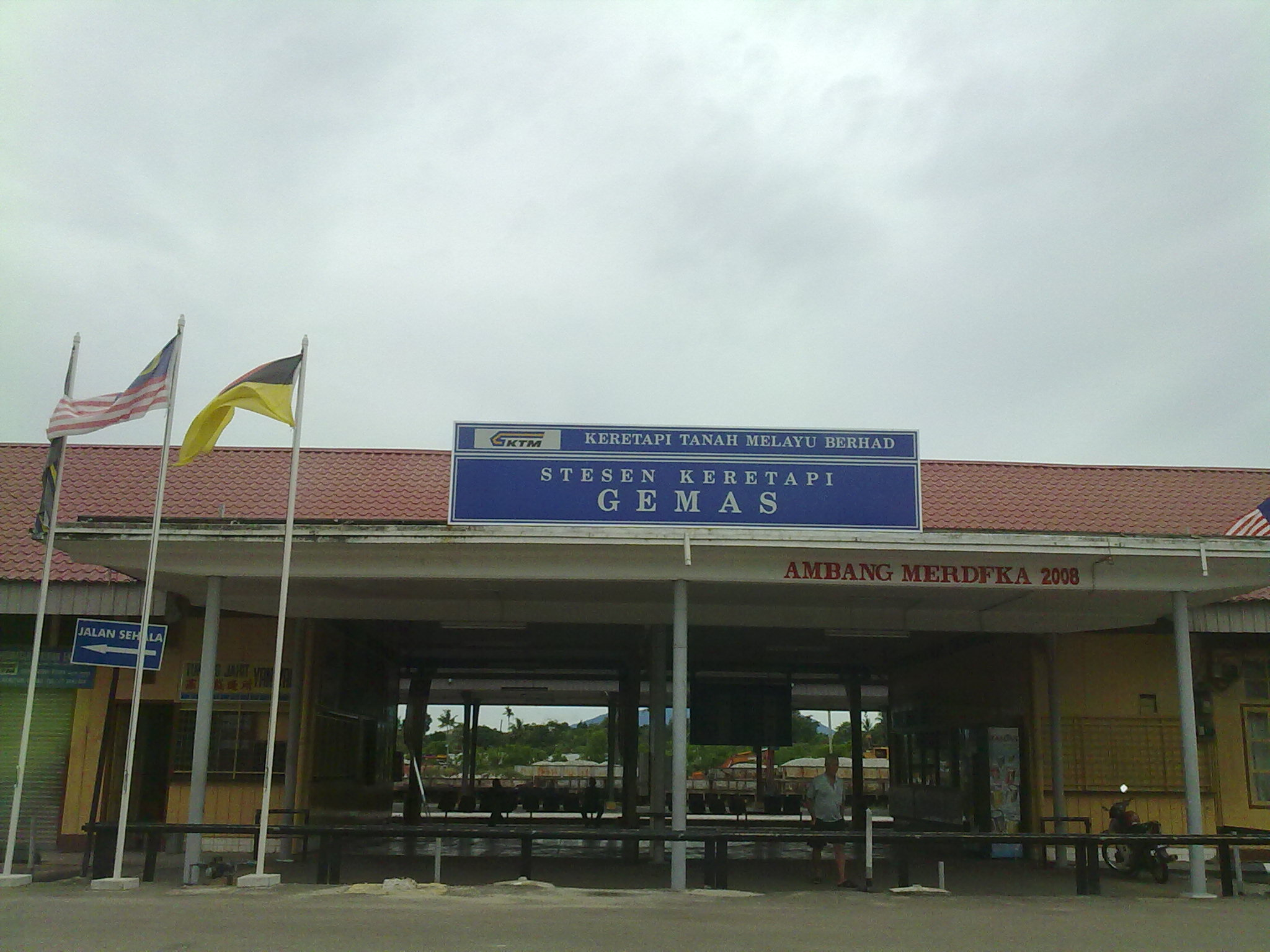
Former KTMB Gemas railway station, now a museum

Gemas (Negeri Sembilan Malay: Gomeh) is a small town and a mukim (township) in Tampin District, Negeri Sembilan, Malaysia, near the Negeri Sembilan-Johor state border. It is 101 km southeast of Seremban, the state capital city, and 32 km north of Segamat, Johor.

Gemas is at the railway junction between the Malaysian west and east coast rail lines.

== Demographics ==
Malays make up the majority of the population at 83% followed by the Chinese 8%, Indians at 5% and others 4%.

== Gemencheh Bridge during the Battle of Malaya ==
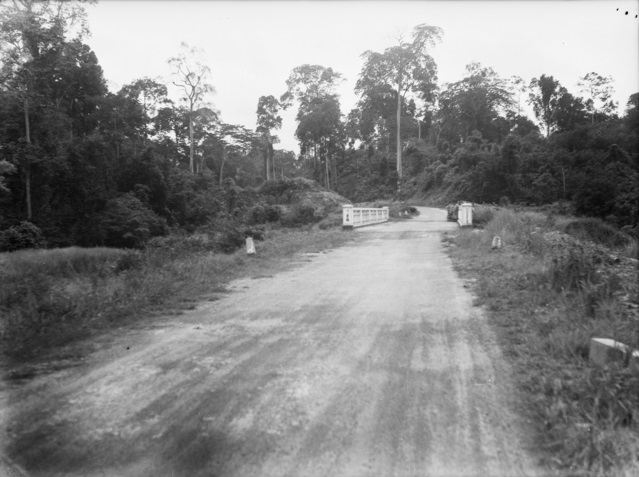
Gemencheh Bridge (middle distance) in 1945.

During the Battle of Malaya in the Second World War, Gemencheh Bridge near Gemas was the site of a fierce battle between the Imperial Japanese Army and the 2/30th Battalion, 8th Division, Australian Imperial Force (AIF). Commanding Officer of the Battalion was Lieutenant Colonel Frederick "Black Jack" Galleghan. Gemencheh Bridge was a bridge over the Kelamah River (Sungai Kelamah in Malay) that connected Gemas with the larger neighbouring town of Tampin. The Japanese had passed through Tampin and needed to cross the bridge to reach Gemas.

On 14 January 1942, "B" Company of the 2/30th Battalion, launched an ambush against the Japanese in the hope of preventing them from advancing further south. As the advancing Japanese soldiers passed by the ambush site, the bridge was blown. The battle following the ambush, and a further battle closer to Gemas, lasted two days. It ended with the Australian withdrawal through Gemas to Fort Rose Estate.

Four days later, another encounter between Japanese and Allied soldiers took place near Parit Sulong during the Battle of Malaya. Allied troops, including the Australian 2/19th and 2/29th Battalions, were surrounded and routed there.

A memorial to Australians killed there is by the site of the destroyed Gemencheh Bridge in Federal Route 1.

== Politics ==
Gemas forms its own electoral district in the Negeri Sembilan State Legislative Assembly.

On the national level, Gemas is part of Tampin constituency of the Malaysian Parliament.

Since 1988 Gemas is also an autonomous sub-district (daerah kecil), consisting of the Adat Perpatih customary districts of Pasir Besar and Ayer Kuning, both protected under the Undang of Johol. Municipal works and parliamentary representation remain under Tampin.

== Gallery ==
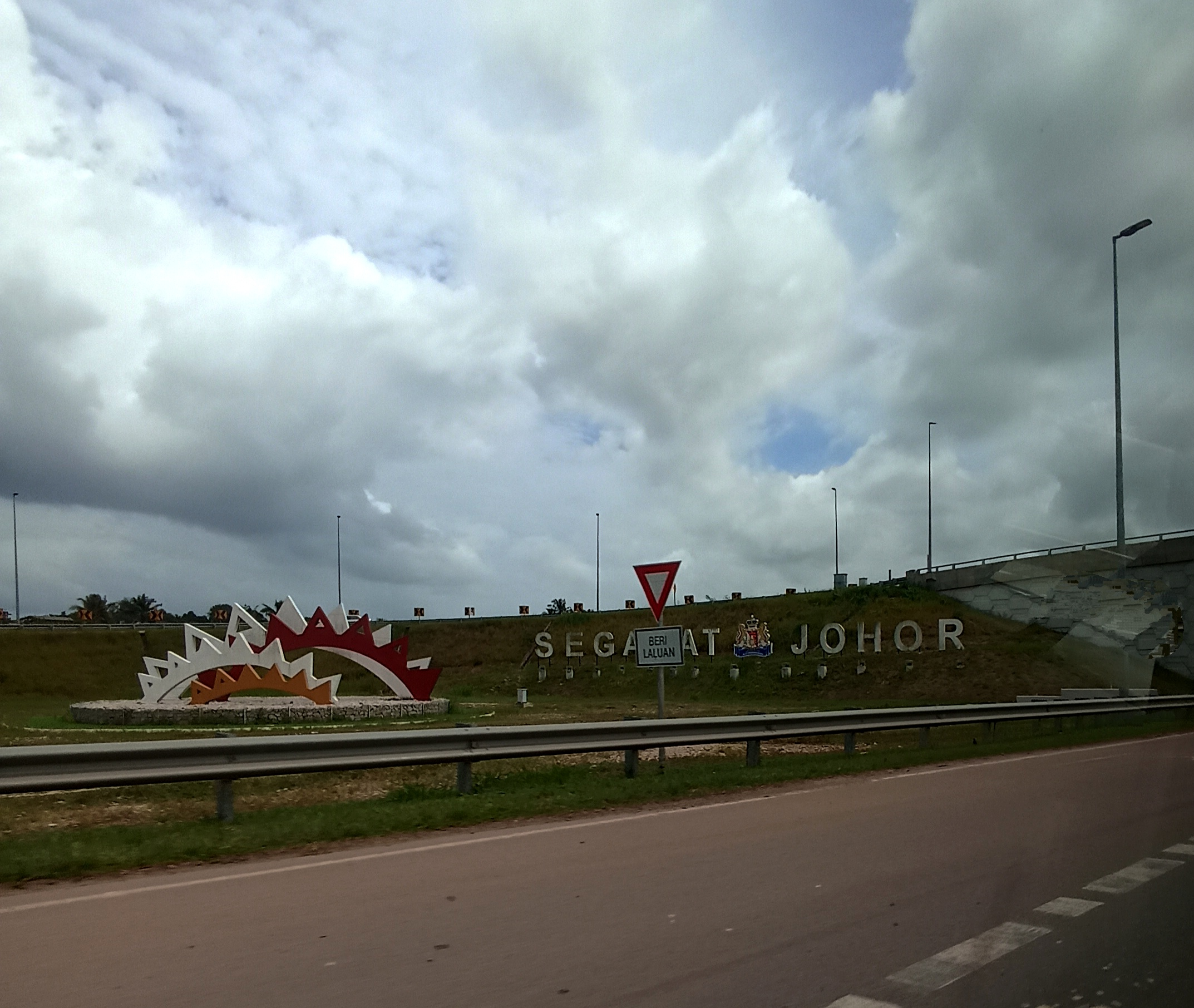
Negeri Sembilan-Johor state border monument

Johor-Negeri Sembilan (background) and Luak Pasir Besar (foreground) border markers

Prewar shophouses

Gemas Bus Station

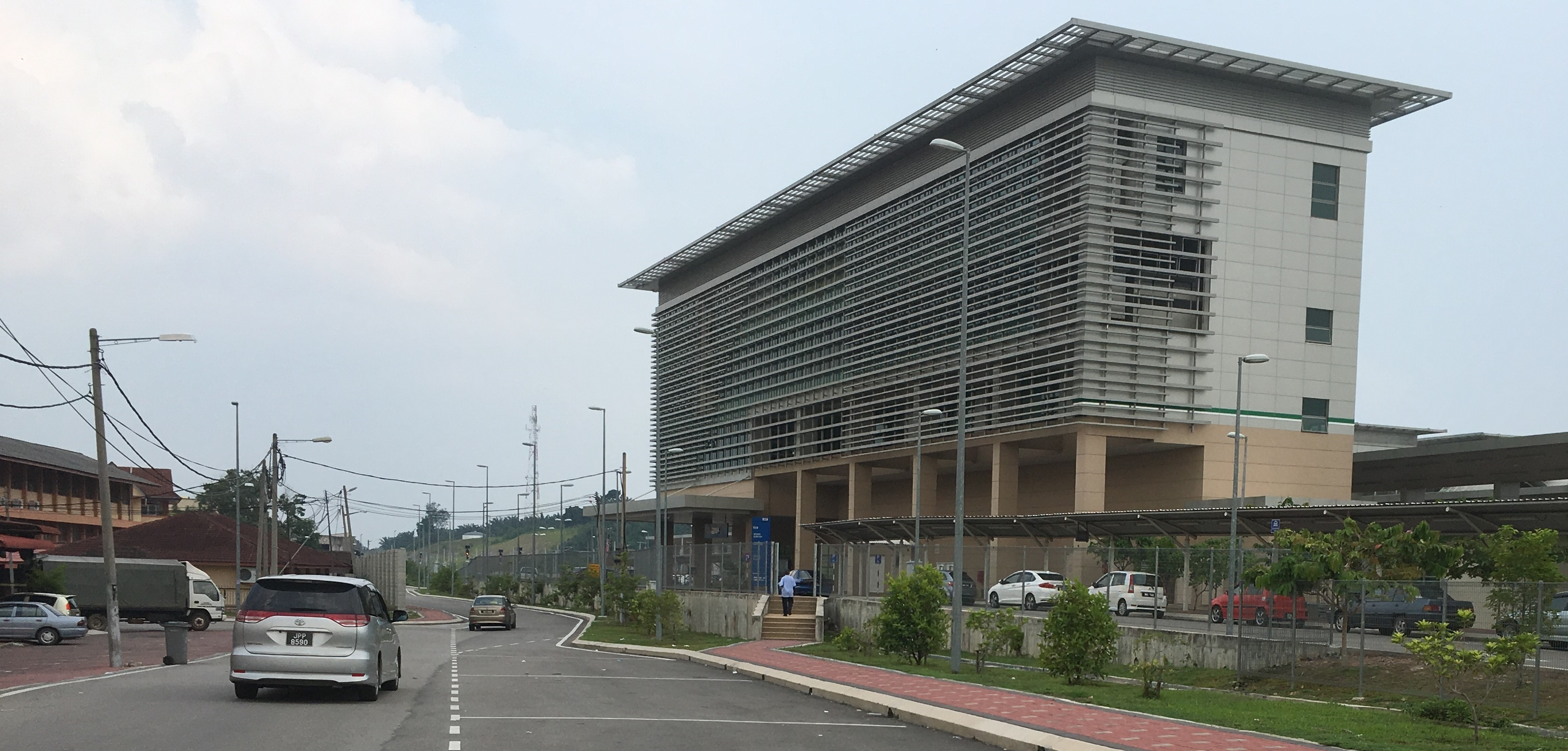
New KTMB Gemas railway station building

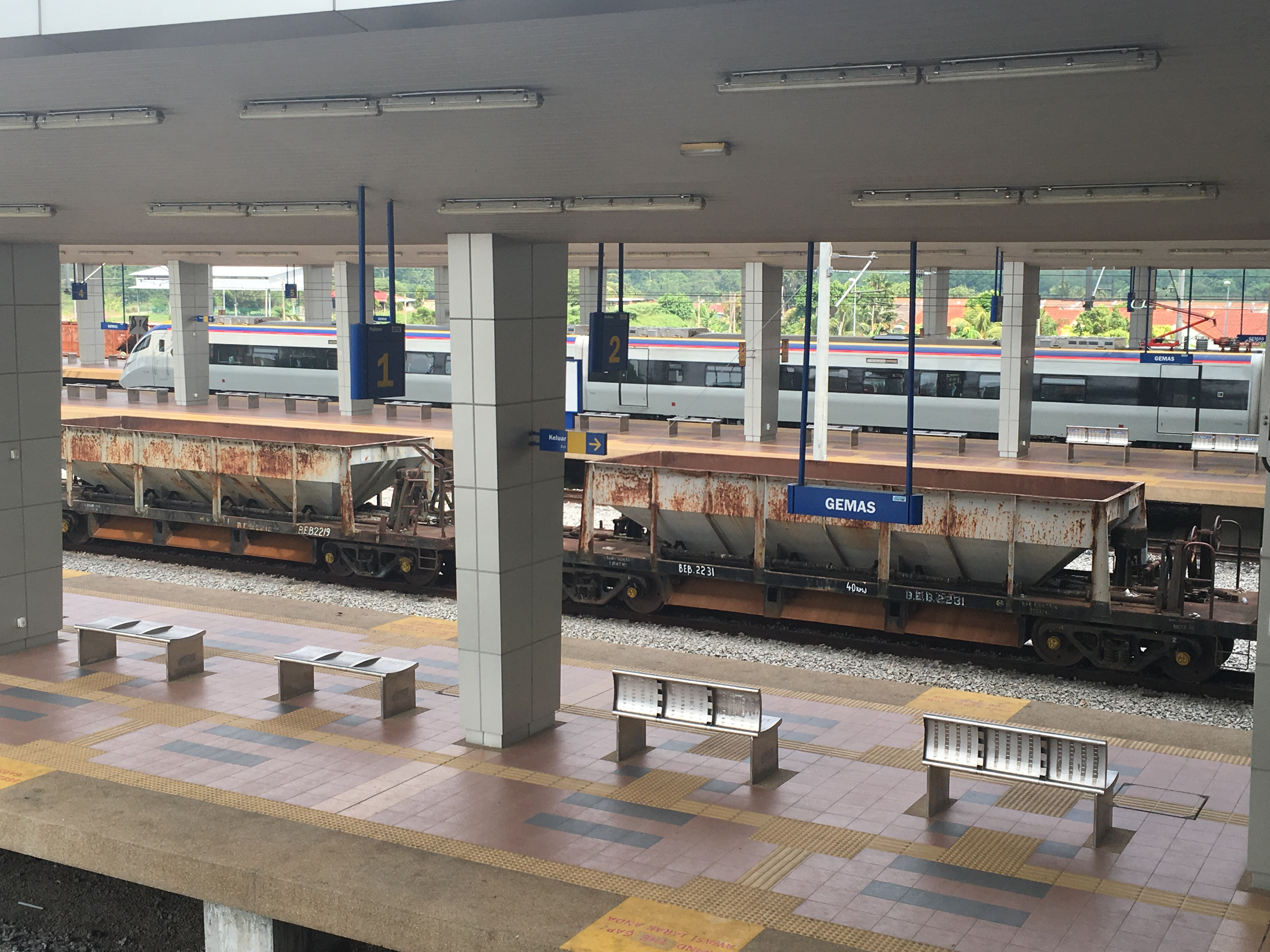
Platforms of the new Gemas station

The East Coast line situated approximately 1.4 kilometres (0.87 mi) from downtown Gemas, northbound towards Tumpat.

== See also ==
- Gemencheh
- Parit Sulong
- Gemas Baharu
