= Shaziman Abu Mansor =

Malaysian politician

Yang Berbahagia Dato' Seri Shaziman Abu Mansor SPMP DGSM DSNS DSAP ANS JP
- شاه عظيمان بن ابو منصور

Minister of Works
- In office 10 April 2009 – 15 May 2013
- Monarchs: Mizan Zainal Abidin; Abdul Halim
- Prime Minister: Abdullah Ahmad Badawi; Najib Razak
- Deputy: Yong Khoon Seng
- Preceded by: Mohd Zin Mohamed
- Succeeded by: Fadillah Yusof
- Constituency: Tampin

Minister of Energy, Water and Communications
- In office 19 March 2008 – 9 April 2009
- Monarch: Mizan Zainal Abidin
- Prime Minister: Abdullah Ahmad Badawi
- Deputy: Joseph Salang Gandum
- Preceded by: Lim Keng Yaik
- Succeeded by: Peter Chin Fah Kui (Energy and Water); Rais Yatim (Communications)
- Constituency: Tampin

Member of the Malaysian Parliament for Tampin
- In office 29 November 1999 – 9 May 2018
- Preceded by: Mohd Noh Rajab (BN–UMNO)
- Succeeded by: Hasan Bahrom (PH–AMANAH)
- Majority: 9,979 (1999); 18,084 (2004); 13,079 (2008); 11,162 (2013)

Personal details
- Born: Shaziman bin Abu Mansor Ipoh, Perak, Malaysia
- Party: United Malays National Organisation (UMNO)
- Other political affiliations: Barisan Nasional (BN); Perikatan Nasional (PN); Muafakat Nasional (MN)
- Spouse: Rozana Mohd Khalid
- Relations: Khairy Jamaluddin (paternal first cousin)
- Parent: Penghulu Abu Mansor Abu Bakar (father)
- Education: Trine University; Universiti Teknologi Malaysia
- Occupation: Politician
- Profession: Civil engineer

Shaziman bin Abu Mansor (Jawi: شاه عظيمان بن ابو منصور) is a Malaysian politician, a prominent member of the United Malays National Organisation (UMNO), a component party of Barisan Nasional (BN) coalition. He is also the former Works Minister of Malaysia.

== Early life ==
Shaziman was born in Ipoh, Perak, to a Malayan Railway worker originally from Rembau, Negeri Sembilan. He was raised in Tampin, Negeri Sembilan, and received his primary education at Tunku Besar Tampin Primary School.

He later earned a Diploma in Civil Engineering from Universiti Teknologi Malaysia in Skudai, Johor Bahru, Johor. He then pursued a Bachelor of Science in Civil Engineering at Tri-State University (now Trine University) in Angola, Indiana, United States.

== Political career ==
Shaziman entered Malaysian politics in 1992 at the age of 28 years, as a member of the Tampin Bandar branch of UMNO in Tampin. Shaziman rose within the ranks of UMNO until he was picked as the head of Tampin divisional UMNO Youth wing in 1997, followed by his appointment as the head of Tampin UMNO division in 2000.

Shaziman was chosen as a candidate for the 1999 general election, contesting for the Tampin parliamentary seat against Hamdan Hashim of Pan-Malaysian Islamic Party (PAS) and winning by a majority of 9,979 votes. Shaziman successfully retained his seat in the next three general elections, defeating Abdul Razakek Abdul Rahim of PAS in 2004, 2008 and 2013. In 2004, Shaziman won by a clear majority of 18,084 votes (against 5,852 votes for Abdul Razakek); 2008 saw a lower share of votes in favour of Shaziman, with 13,079 votes (against 10,943 votes for Abdul Razakek) and 11,162 majority in 2013. In the 2018 election, Shaziman lost to Hasan Baharom of Parti Amanah Negara (AMANAH), in a three-corner fight with PAS's Abdul Razakek for the Tampin parliamentary seat.

After the 2004 general election, Shaziman was included into the Cabinet of Malaysia as the Deputy Minister of Energy, Water and Communications, under the leadership of Energy, Water and Communications Minister Lim Keng Yaik. Following Lim's announcement of his retirement as the President of Parti Gerakan Rakyat Malaysia (GERAKAN) in 2007, Shaziman was promoted as the new Minister of Energy, Water and Communications on 18 March 2008.

== Views on the Malaysian blogsphere ==
Since assuming the role of Deputy Minister of Energy, Water and Communications in 2004, Shaziman has expressed views against anonymous bloggers whom he accuses of "[spreading] negative or malicious content on the Internet" which "could harm the country's security". In a weekly Parliament meeting on 23 August 2006, Shaziman branded anonymous bloggers "penembak curi", a Malay term for "snipers", and challenged said bloggers to step forth and debate issues they are dissatisfied with:

It is difficult for the Government if we were to regulate Internet users because they can easily register in other countries [...] We cannot control them. If in the old days we used to have Wild Wild West, now we have Wild Wild Web [...] Wild Wild Web are bloggers who hide and shoot but are afraid to come out in the open for confrontation [...] If they are truly gentlemen and responsible (for what they blogged), they should show themselves.

— The Star

In a later Parliament meeting held on 4 April 2007, Shaziman expressed the idea of compulsory registration for bloggers whose blogs are hosted on local servers, one of several measures the Government was considering to curb publication of malicious materials on the Internet, adding the ministry does not have any problem with bloggers who identified themselves but reiterating his view of welcoming blogging activities. Deputy Prime Minister Najib Tun Razak sided Shaziman, stating bloggers have made the "business of government more challenging" and in certain cases, caused unnecessary distraction.

Shaziman's suggestion on 4 April drew flak from a member of the Opposition, as well as two prominent bloggers, Jeff Ooi and Ahiruddin Attan, both of whom have been sued by the New Straits Times Press in January 2007. Democratic Action Party (DAP) leader Lim Kit Siang, who interjected when Shaziman was speaking in Parliament, claimed the government ministries' negative view of bloggers "reflected their lack of understanding about information flow" when foreign politicians already have their own blogs. Blogger and activist Marina Mahathir stated the move will only ridicule the government in the international community and told the Government to "get real", while Ahiruddin has stated the proposed measure undermines the country's no-censorship policy with regards to the Internet, and creates fear among bloggers, who will in turn decide to host their blogs overseas. Jeff Ooi questioned the need for blogger registration when a Communications and Multimedia Content Forum dealing with complaints by any party was already put in place by the Malaysian Communications and Multimedia Commission (MCMC) since the introduction of the Communications and Multimedia Act in 1998, and claims the proposal goes against global trends and will stifle development of local web content.

== Election results ==
Parliament of Malaysia
Year	Constituency	Candidate	Votes	Pct	Opponent(s)	Votes	Pct	Ballots cast	Majority	Turnout
1999	P115 Tampin	Shaziman Abu Mansor (UMNO)	21,944	64.71%	Hamdan Hashim (PAS)	11,965	35.29%	35,246	9,979	74.00%
2004	P133 Tampin	Shaziman Abu Mansor (UMNO)	23,936	80.35%	Abdul Razakek Abdul Rahim (PAS)	5,852	19.65%	30,778	18,084	74.04%
2008	P133 Tampin	Shaziman Abu Mansor (UMNO)	24,022	68.70%	Abdul Razakek Abdul Rahim (PAS)	10,943	31.30%	36,331	13,079	76.24%
2013	P133 Tampin	Shaziman Abu Mansor (UMNO)	29,390	61.72%	Abdul Razakek Abdul Rahim (PAS)	18,228	38.28%	48,799	11,162	85.21%
2018	P133 Tampin	Shaziman Abu Mansor (UMNO)	21,433	44.22%	Hasan Bahrom (AMANAH)	22,435	46.29%	49,515	1,002	81.49%
2018	P133 Tampin	Shaziman Abu Mansor (UMNO)	21,433	44.22%	Abdul Razakek Abdul Rahim (PAS)	4,598	9.49%	49,515	1,002	81.49%

== Honours ==
- Malacca
  - Grand Commander of the Exalted Order of Malacca (DGSM) – Datuk Seri (2011)
- Negeri Sembilan
  - Knight Companion of the Order of Loyalty to Negeri Sembilan (DSNS) – Dato' (2002)
  - Member of the Order of Loyalty to Negeri Sembilan (ANS) (1998)
  - Justice of the Peace (JP) (2001)
- Pahang
  - Knight Companion of the Order of Sultan Ahmad Shah of Pahang (DSAP) – Dato' (2004)
- Perak
  - Knight Grand Commander of the Order of the Perak State Crown (SPMP) – Dato' Seri (2012)

== See also ==
- Tampin (federal constituency)
