= Gemencheh =

Mukim in Tampin, Negeri Sembilan, Malaysia

Coordinates: 2°5′0″N 102°4′33″E

Gemencheh Moncheh (Negeri Sembilan Malay)
- Mukim
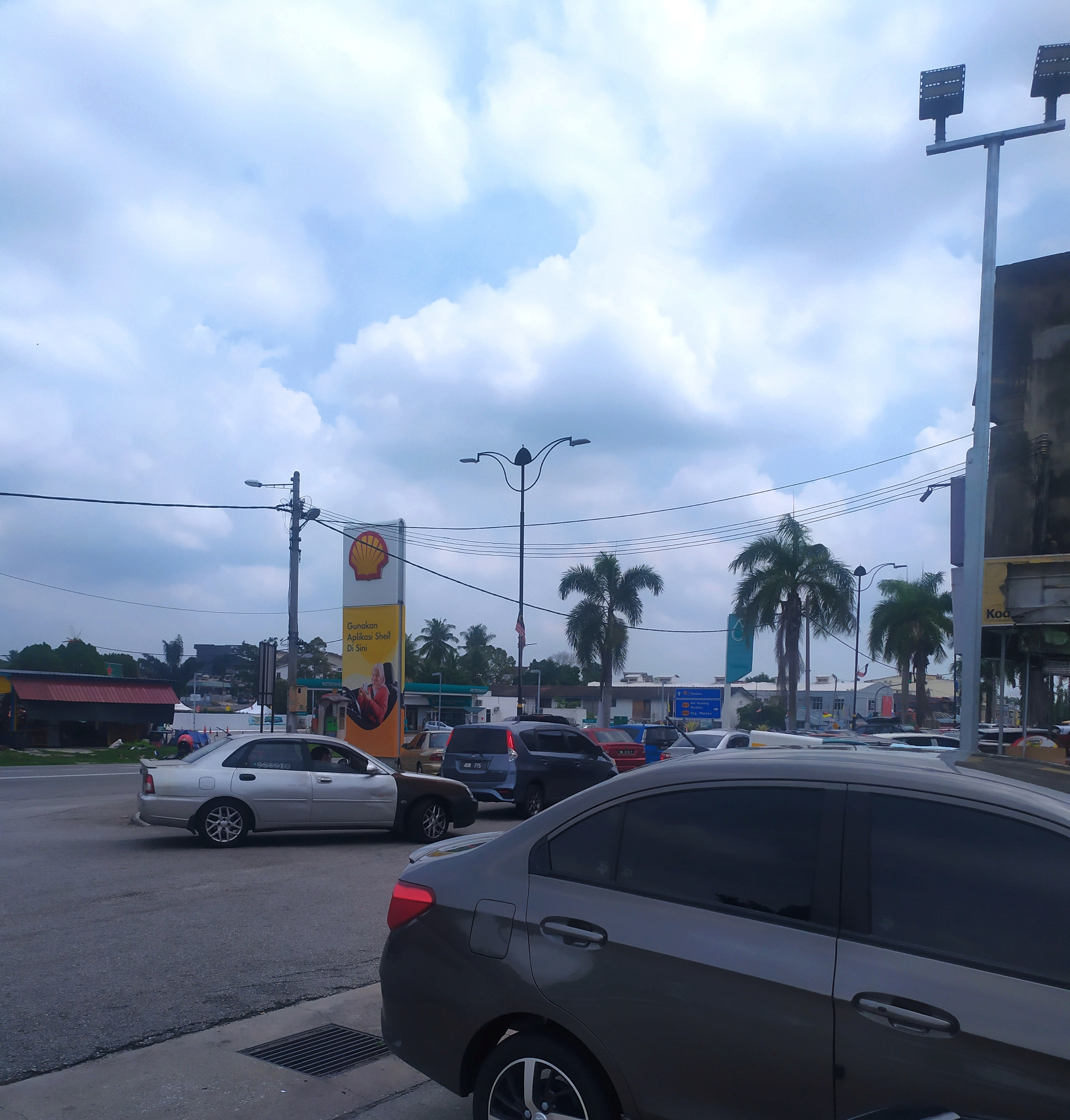
- Interactive map of Gemencheh
- Country: Malaysia
- State: Negeri Sembilan
- District: Tampin
- Luak: Gemencheh

Government
  - Body: Tampin District Council
  - President: Suriati Salihan
  - MP: Mohd Isam Mohd Isa (BN–UMNO)
  - MLA: Suhaimizan Bizar (BN–UMNO)
- Time zone: UTC+8 (MST)
- Postcode: 73200

Gemencheh
- Luak Beradat
- Luak Gemencheh
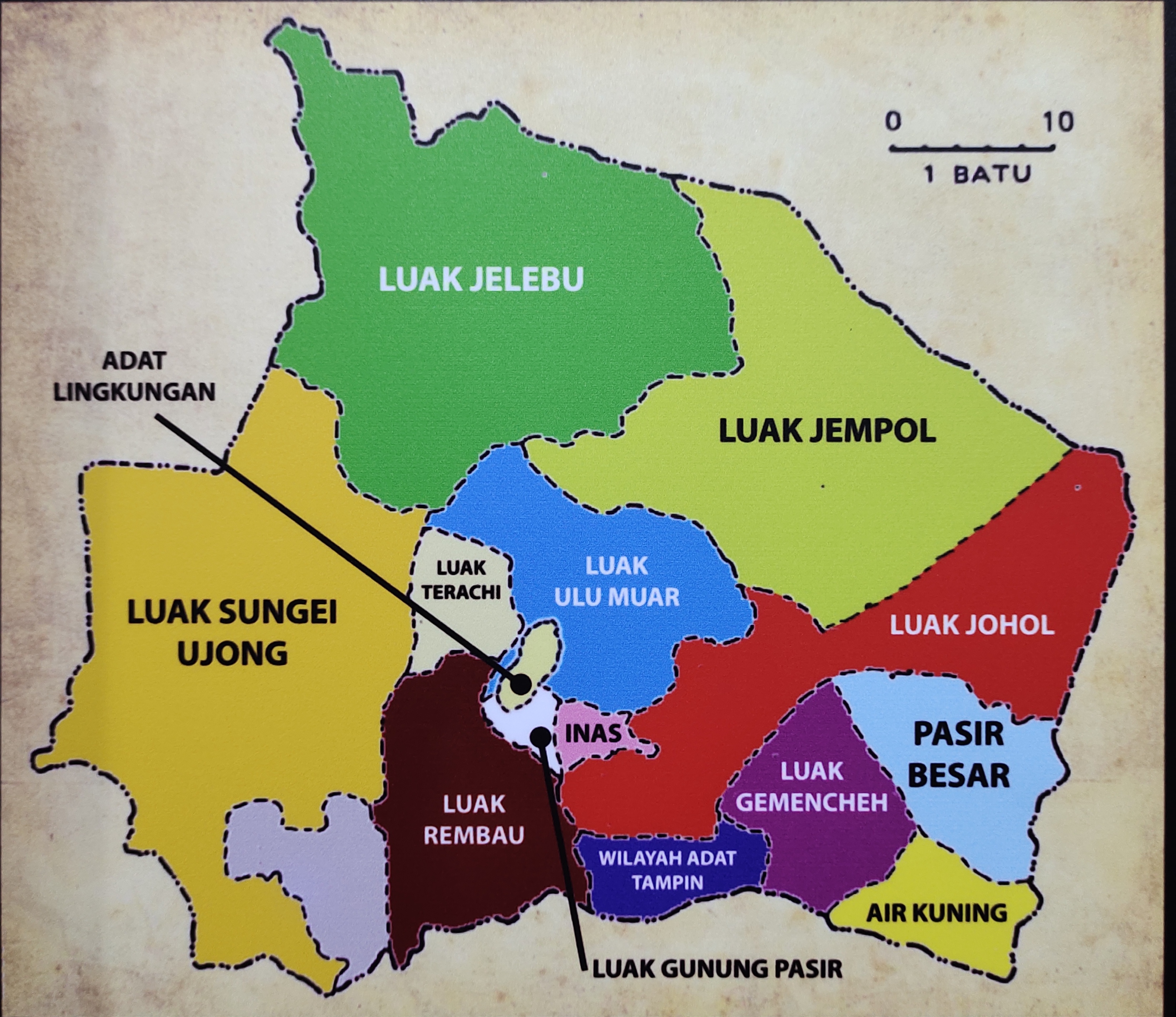
- Luak of Gemencheh relative to other luaks in Negeri Sembilan
- Country: Malaysia
- State: Negeri Sembilan
- Adat institution: Undang of Johol

Government
  - Penghulu: Abdull Malik Abdull Ghani

Mukim Gemencheh in Tampin District

Gemencheh (Negeri Sembilan Malay: Moncheh) is a mukim in Tampin District, Negeri Sembilan, Malaysia. The Gemencheh Bridge is famous for being ground for the Battle of Gemas during the Second World War between Japanese and Australian forces. It is also well known for the production of maman, which is a type of edible leaves that takes two to three hours to cook for the leaves to become crispy and the gravy to dry up, resulting in a rich, flavourful traditional leafy maman rendang.

== Gemencheh Bridge during the Battle of Malaya ==
During the Battle of Malaya in the Second World War, Gemencheh Bridge near Gemas was the site of a fierce battle between the Imperial Japanese Army and the 2/30 Battalion, 8 Division, Australian Imperial Force (AIF). Commanding Officer of the Battalion was Lieutenant Colonel Frederick "Black Jack" Galleghan. Gemencheh Bridge was a bridge over the Gemencheh River that connected Gemas with Gemencheh and the larger neighbouring town of Tampin. The Japanese had passed through Tampin and needed to cross the bridge to reach Gemas.

On 14 January 1942, "B" Company of the 2/30th Battalion, launched an ambush against the Japanese in the hope of preventing them from advancing further south. As the advancing Japanese soldiers on bicycles passed by the ambush site, the bridge was blown. The Australians then opened fire on the Japanese column and killed about 700 Japanese soldiers. The battle following the ambush, and a further battle closer to Gemas, lasted two days. It ended with the Australian withdrawal through Gemas to Fort Rose Estate.

Four days later, another encounter between Japanese and Allied soldiers took place near Parit Sulong during the Battle of Malaya. Allied troops, including the Australian 2/19th and 2/29th Battalions, were surrounded and routed there.

A memorial remembering fallen Australians now stands somewhere near the site of the destroyed Gemencheh Bridge in Federal route 1.

== See also ==
- Gemas
- Parit Sulong, Johor
