= Hasan Bahrom =

Malaysian politician (born 1956)

Yang Berbahagia Datuk Hasan Bahrom DMSM
- حسن بهروم

Chairman of Yayasan Dakwah Islamiah Malaysia
- Incumbent
- Assumed office 3 May 2025
- Minister: Mohd Na'im Mokhtar
- Deputy: Adi Anuar Azmin @ Che Wan
- Preceded by: Hasanuddin Mohd Yunus

Chancellor of the Malacca Islamic University College
- In office 1 September 2018 – 1 April 2020
- Preceded by: Mohd Ali Rustam
- Succeeded by: Mohd Ali Rustam

Member of the Malaysian Parliament for Tampin
- In office 9 May 2018 – 19 November 2022
- Preceded by: Shaziman Abu Mansor (BN–UMNO)
- Succeeded by: Mohd Isam Mohd Isa (BN–UMNO)
- Majority: 21,433 (2018)

Faction represented in Dewan Rakyat
- 2018–2022: Pakatan Harapan

Personal details
- Born: Hasan bin Bahrom; 10 April 1956 (age 69) Gemas, Negeri Sembilan
- Party: National Trust Party (AMANAH) (since 2015)
- Other political affiliations: Pakatan Harapan (PH) (since 2015)
- Children: 5
- Education: SK Kampung Ladang; Sekolah Agama Rendah Gemas; Sekolah Menengah Tinggi Seremban
- Alma mater: National University of Malaysia; University of Malaya
- Occupation: Politician
- Profession: Lecturer

Hasan bin Bahrom (born 10 April 1956) is a Malaysian politician who served as the Member of Parliament (MP) for Tampin from May 2018 to November 2022 and Chairman of the Yayasan Dakwah Islamiah Malaysia (YADIM) from since May 2025. He previously served as the Chancellor of the Malacca Islamic University College from September 2018 to April 2020. He is a member of the National Trust Party (AMANAH), a component party of the Pakatan Harapan (PH) coalition.

== Election result ==
Parliament of Malaysia
Year	Constituency	Candidate	Votes	Pct	Opponent(s)	Votes	Pct	Ballots cast	Majority	Turnout
2018	P133 Tampin	Hasan Bahrom (AMANAH)	22,435	46.29%	Shaziman Abu Mansor (UMNO)	21,433	44.22%	49,515	1,002	81.49%
2018	P133 Tampin	Hasan Bahrom (AMANAH)	22,435	46.29%	Abdul Razakek Abdul Rahim (PAS)	4,598	9.49%	49,515	1,002	81.49%

== Honours ==
- Malacca
  - Companion Class I of the Exalted Order of Malacca (DMSM) – Datuk (2018)
