= Abdul Razak Said =

Malaysian politician (born 1965)

Yang Berbahagia Dato' Abd Razak Ab Said DPNS PMC PJK
- عبد الرزّاق بن أب سعيد

Member of the Negeri Sembilan State Executive Council (Culture & Malay Customs)
- In office 22 May 2013 – 12 May 2018
- Monarch: Muhriz
- Menteri Besar: Mohamad Hasan
- Preceded by: Mohammad Razi Kail
- Succeeded by: Mohamad Nazaruddin Sabtu
- Constituency: Gemas

Member of the Negeri Sembilan State Legislative Assembly for Gemas
- In office 5 May 2013 – 12 August 2023
- Preceded by: Zainab Nasir (BN–UMNO)
- Succeeded by: Ridzuan Ahmad (PN-BERSATU)
- Majority: 10,911 (2013); 4,772 (2018)

Faction represented in Negeri Sembilan State Legislative Assembly
- 2013–2023: Barisan Nasional

Personal details
- Born: 20 June 1965 (age 61) Malaysia
- Citizenship: Malaysian
- Party: United Malays National Organisation (UMNO)
- Other political affiliations: Barisan Nasional (BN)
- Spouse: Zaiton Yakob
- Children: Anis Fazdlin; Atiqa Farhani; Azril Fahmi
- Occupation: Politician

Abd Razak bin Ab Said (born 20 June 1965) is a Malaysian politician who had served as Member of the Negeri Sembilan State Legislative Assembly (MLA) for Gemas from May 2013 to August 2023. He served as Member of the Negeri Sembilan State Executive Council (EXCO) in the Barisan Nasional (BN) state administration under former Menteri Besar Mohamad Hasan from May 2013 to the collapse of the BN state administration in May 2018. He is a member of the United Malays National Organisation (UMNO), a component party of the BN coalition.

== Election results ==
Negeri Sembilan State Legislative Assembly
Year	Constituency	Candidate	Votes	Pct	Opponent(s)	Votes	Pct	Ballots cast	Majority	Turnout
2013	N34 Gemas	Abdul Razak Said (UMNO)	15,040	78.46%	Azizan Marzuki (PKR)	4,129	21.54%	19,520	10,911	86.00%
2018	N34 Gemas	Abdul Razak Said (UMNO)	9,853	56.16%	Baharuddin Arif Siri (PKR)	5,081	28.95%	17,920	4,772	80.30%
2018	N34 Gemas	Abdul Razak Said (UMNO)	9,853	56.16%	Abd Halim Abu Bakar (PAS)	2,612	14.89%	17,920	4,772	80.30%
2023	N34 Gemas	Abdul Razak Said (UMNO)	8,533	42.27%	Ridzuan Ahmad (BERSATU)	11,653	57.73%	20,437	3,120	68.93%

== Honours ==
- Negeri Sembilan
  - Knight Commander of the Order of Loyalty to Negeri Sembilan (DPNS) – Dato' (2016)
