= Rembau-Tampin (federal constituency) =

Federal constituency in Negeri Sembilan, Malaysia

Negeri Sembilan constituency

Defunct federal constituency
- Legislature: Dewan Rakyat
- Constituency created: 1958
- Constituency abolished: 1974
- First contested: 1959
- Last contested: 1972

Rembau-Tampin was a federal constituency in Negeri Sembilan, Malaysia, that was represented in the Dewan Rakyat from 1959 to 1974.

The federal constituency was created in the 1974 redistribution and was mandated to return a single member to the Dewan Rakyat under the first past the post voting system.

== History ==
It was abolished in 1974 when it was redistributed.

=== Representation history ===
Members of Parliament for Rembau-Tampin
Parliament	No	Years	Member	Party	Vote Share
Constituency created from Negri Sembilan Selatan
Parliament of the Federation of Malaya
1st	P081	1959-1963	Redza Mohd Said (رضا محمد سعيد)	Alliance (UMNO)	9,587; 68.69%
Parliament of Malaysia
1st	P081	1963-1964	Redza Mohd Said (رضا محمد سعيد)	Alliance (UMNO)	9,587; 68.69%
2nd	P081	1964-1969	Redza Mohd Said (رضا محمد سعيد)	Alliance (UMNO)	11,837; 65.35%
		1969-1971	Parliament was suspended		
3rd	P081	1971-1972	Sulaiman Mohamed Attas (سليمان محمد اتتس)	Alliance (UMNO)	Uncontested
3rd	P081	1972-1973	Mokhtar Hashim (مختار هشيم)	Alliance (UMNO)	13,228; 63.81%
3rd	P081	1973-1974	Mokhtar Hashim (مختار هشيم)	BN (UMNO)	13,228; 63.81%
Constituency abolished, split into Seremban and Tampin

=== State constituency ===
Parliamentary constituency	State constituency						
Parliamentary constituency	1955–59*	1959–1974	1974–1986	1986–1995	1995–2004	2004–2018	2018–present
Rembau-Tampin		Gemas					
Rembau-Tampin		Kota					
Rembau-Tampin		Tampin					
Rembau-Tampin		Terentang					

=== Historical boundaries ===
State Constituency	Area
State Constituency	1959
Gemas	Air Kuning; FELDA Jelai; FELDA Pasir Besar; Gemas; Kampung Parit Mulu
Kota	Chengkau; Kampung Orang Asli Pabai Miku; Kampung Pulau Hanyut; Kendong; Kota
Tampin	Gemencheh; FELDA Bukit Rokan; Kampung Sungai Dua; Orek; Tampin
Terentang	Chembong; Kampung Orang Asli Ulu Chuai; Pedas; Rembau; Terentang

== Election results ==
Malaysian general by-election, 8 July 1972 Upon the death of incumbent, Sulaiman Mohamed Attas
Party	Candidate	Votes	%	∆%
Alliance	Mokhtar Hashim	13,228	63.81	▲63.81
PMIP	Tengku Jaril Tengku Sulaiman	4,018	19.38	▲19.38
DAP	Muhamed Sharif Harun	3,483	16.80	▲16.80
Total valid votes		20,729	100.00	
Total rejected ballots		372		
Unreturned ballots		0		
Turnout		21,101		
Registered electors				
Majority		9,210	44.43	
Alliance hold		Swing		

Malaysian general election, 1969
Party	Candidate	Votes	%	∆%
On the nomination day, Sulaiman Mohamed Attas won uncontested.
Alliance	Sulaiman Mohamed Attas			
Total valid votes			100.00	
Total rejected ballots				
Unreturned ballots				
Turnout				
Registered electors		27,145		
Majority				
Alliance hold		Swing		

Malaysian general election, 1964
Party	Candidate	Votes	%	∆%
Alliance	Redza Mohd Said	11,837	65.35	▼3.34
Socialist Front	Abdul Rahman Mohamed	3,583	19.78	▲19.78
UDP	Baba Ludek	2,693	14.87	▲14.87
Total valid votes		18,113	100.00	
Total rejected ballots		759		
Unreturned ballots		0		
Turnout		18,872	82.10	▲6.05
Registered electors		22,987		
Majority		8,254	45.57	▲8.19
Alliance hold		Swing		

Malayan general election, 1959
Party	Candidate	Votes	%
Alliance	Redza Mohd Said	9,587	68.69
National Party	Baba Ludek	4,369	31.31
Total valid votes		13,956	100.00
Total rejected ballots		167	
Unreturned ballots		0	
Turnout		14,123	76.05
Registered electors		18,571	
Majority		5,218	37.38
This was a new constituency created.
