= Suhaimizan Bizar =

Malaysian politician

Yang Berhormat Tuan Suhaimizan Bizar ANS PJK MLA

Member of the Negeri Sembilan State Legislative Assembly for Gemencheh
- Incumbent
- Assumed office 12 August 2023
- Preceded by: Mohd Isam Mohd Isa (BN–UMNO)
- Majority: 2,434 (2023)

Personal details
- Party: United Malays National Organisation (UMNO)
- Other political affiliations: Barisan Nasional (BN)
- Relations: Waad Mansor (father-in-law)
- Occupation: Politician

Suhaimizan bin Bizar is a Malaysian politician who has been serving as a member of the Sembilan Legislative Assembly for Gemencheh since August 2023.

== Election results ==
Negeri Sembilan State Legislative Assembly
Year	Constituency	Candidate	Votes	Pct	Opponent(s)	Votes	Pct	Ballots cast	Majority	Turnout
2023	N35 Gemencheh	Suhaimizan Bizar (UMNO)	8,905	57.91%	Tengku Abdullah Tengku Rakhman (PAS)	6,471	42.09%	15,519	2,434	63.08%

== Honours ==
- Negeri Sembilan
  - Member of the Order of Loyalty to Negeri Sembilan (ANS) (2025)
  - Recipient of the Meritorious Service Medal (PJK) (2016)
