= Gemas (state constituency) =

Political subdivision in Malaysia

Gemas (N34)
Negeri Sembilan constituency

State constituency
- Legislature: Negeri Sembilan State Legislative Assembly
MLA
Ridzuan Ahmad
PN
- Constituency created: 1959
- First contested: 1959
- Last contested: 2026

Demographics
- Electors (2023): 29,648

N34 Gemas within Negeri Sembilan, as used for the 2023 and 2026 state elections

Gemas is a state constituency in Negeri Sembilan, Malaysia, that has been represented in the Negeri Sembilan State Legislative Assembly.

The state constituency was first contested in 1959 and is mandated to return a single Assemblyman to the Negeri Sembilan State Legislative Assembly under the first-past-the-post voting system.

== Demographics ==
Ethnic breakdown of Gemas's electorate as of 2026
1. Malay (83.6%)
2. Chinese (7.70%)
3. Indian (4.90%)
4. Other ethnicities (3.90%)

== History ==
=== Polling districts ===
According to the gazette issued on 23 July 2026, the Gemas constituency has a total of 7 polling districts.

State constituency	Polling districts	Code	Location
Gemas（N34）	FELDA Jelai 1 & 3	133/34/01	SK Jelai 1; SK Jelai 3 (FELDA)
Gemas（N34）	Pasir Besar	133/34/02	SMK FELDA Pasir Besar (FELDA)
Gemas（N34）	FELDA Pasir Besar	133/34/03	SK (FELDA) Pasir Besar
Gemas（N34）	Kampong Ladang	133/34/04	SK Kampong Ladang
Gemas（N34）	Pekan Gemas	133/34/05	SK Gemas
Gemas（N34）	Taman Sentosa	133/34/06	SMK Gemas; SK Tuanku Abdul Rahman
Gemas（N34）	FELDA Jelai 2 &4	133/34/07	SK Jelai 2 (FELDA); SMK Jelai (FELDA)

=== Representation history ===
Members of the Legislative Assembly for Gemas
Assembly	No	Years	Member	Party
Constituency created
1st	N11	1959-1962	Fong Yew Wang (馮有旺)	Alliance (MCA)
1st	N11	1962	Fong Yew Wang (馮有旺)	Socialist Front (Lab)
1st	N11	1962-1964	Goh Boon Tah (吳寶塔)	Alliance (MCA)
2nd	N11	1964-1969	Lim Heng Seng (林廷清)	Alliance (MCA)
		1969-1971	Assembly dissolved	
3rd	N11	1971-1973	Lim Heng Seng (林廷清)	Alliance (MCA)
3rd	N11	1973-1974	Lim Heng Seng (林廷清)	BN (UMNO)
4th	N23	1974-1978	Mohamed Salleh Mohamed Hashim	BN (UMNO)
5th	N23	1978-1982	Mohamed Salleh Mohamed Hashim	BN (UMNO)
6th	N23	1982-1986	Mohamed Salleh Mohamed Hashim	BN (UMNO)
7th	N09	1986-1990	Mohd Yassin Abu Bakar	BN (UMNO)
8th	N09	1990-1995	Mohd Yassin Abu Bakar	BN (UMNO)
9th	N09	1995-1999	Mohd Yassin Abu Bakar	BN (UMNO)
10th	N09	1999-2004	Mohd Yassin Abu Bakar	BN (UMNO)
11th	N34	2004-2008	Jamluz Aziz	BN (UMNO)
12th	N34	2008-2013	Zainab Nasir	BN (UMNO)
13th	N34	2013-2018	Abdul Razak Said	BN (UMNO)
14th	N34	2018-2023	Abdul Razak Said	BN (UMNO)
15th	N34	2023–2026	Ridzuan Ahmad	PN (BERSATU)
16th	N34	2026–present	Ridzuan Ahmad	PN (WAWASAN)

== Election results ==
Negeri Sembilan state election, 2026
Party	Candidate	Votes	%	∆%
PN	Ridzuan Ahmad	16,153	78.06	▲20.33
PH	Siti Aishah Seman @ Othman	3,529	17.05	▲17.05
BERSATU	Zolazrai Zolkapli	1,012	4.89	▲4.89
Total valid votes		20,694	100.00	
Total rejected ballots		228		
Unreturned ballots		20		
Turnout		20,942	70.75	▲1.65
Registered electors		29,600		
Majority		12,624	61.00	▲45.54
PN hold		Swing		

Negeri Sembilan state election, 2023
Party	Candidate	Votes	%	∆%
PN	Ridzuan Ahmad	11,653	57.73	▲57.73
BN	Abdul Razak Said	8,533	42.27	▼13.89
Total valid votes		20,186	100.00	
Total rejected ballots		251		
Unreturned ballots		16		
Turnout		20,453	68.99	▼11.30
Registered electors		29,648		
Majority		3,120	15.46	▼11.74
PN gain from BN		Swing		?

Negeri Sembilan state election, 2018
Party	Candidate	Votes	%	∆%
BN	Abdul Razak Said	9,853	56.16	▼22.30
PKR	Baharuddin Arif Siri	5,081	28.96	▲7.42
PAS	Abdul Halim Abu Bakar	2,612	14.89	▲14.89
Total valid votes		17,546	100.00	
Total rejected ballots		283		
Unreturned ballots		91		
Turnout		17,920	80.29	▼5.67
Registered electors		22,318		
Majority		4,772	27.20	▼29.72
BN hold		Swing		

Negeri Sembilan state election, 2013
Party	Candidate	Votes	%	∆%
BN	Abdul Razak Said	15,040	78.46	▼0.70
PKR	Karip Mohd Salleh	4,129	21.54	▲21.54
Total valid votes		19,169	100.00	
Total rejected ballots		351		
Unreturned ballots		53		
Turnout		19,573	85.96	▲6.78
Registered electors		22,771		
Majority		10,911	56.92	▼1.40
BN hold		Swing		

Negeri Sembilan state election, 2008
Party	Candidate	Votes	%	∆%
BN	Zainab Nasir	10,811	79.16	▼3.80
PAS	Mohd Ali Maarof	2,846	20.84	▲3.80
Total valid votes		13,657	100.00	
Total rejected ballots		345		
Unreturned ballots		224		
Turnout		14,226	79.18	▲3.75
Registered electors		17,966		
Majority		7,965	58.32	▼7.61
BN hold		Swing		

Negeri Sembilan state election, 2004
Party	Candidate	Votes	%	∆%
BN	Jamlus Aziz	8,610	82.96	▲15.96
PAS	Md Rais Mohamad (Basiron)	1,768	17.04	▼15.96
Total valid votes		10,378	100.00	
Total rejected ballots		200		
Unreturned ballots		110		
Turnout		10,688	75.43	▼1.92
Registered electors		14,169		
Majority		6,842	65.93	▲31.93
BN hold		Swing		

Negeri Sembilan state election, 1999
Party	Candidate	Votes	%	∆%
BN	Mohamad Yassin Bakar	5,634	67.00	▼6.71
PAS	Aziz Ramli	2,775	33.00	▲6.71
Total valid votes		8,409	100.00	
Total rejected ballots		177		
Unreturned ballots		398		
Turnout		8,984	77.35	▲1.36
Registered electors		11,614		
Majority		2,859	34.00	▼13.42
BN hold		Swing		

Negeri Sembilan state election, 1995
Party	Candidate	Votes	%	∆%
BN	Mohamad Yassin Bakar	5,661	73.71	▼7.38
PAS	Mohd Noah Talib	2,019	26.29	▲7.38
Total valid votes		7,680	100.00	
Total rejected ballots		255		
Unreturned ballots		91		
Turnout		8,026	76.00	▼2.54
Registered electors		10,561		
Majority		3,642	47.42	▼14.77
BN hold		Swing		

Negeri Sembilan state election, 1990
Party	Candidate	Votes	%	∆%
BN	Mohamad Yassin Bakar	7,172	81.09	▼1.69
PAS	Baharudin Leman	1,672	18.91	▲1.69
Total valid votes		8,844	100.00	
Total rejected ballots		283		
Unreturned ballots		8		
Turnout		9,135	78.54	▲4.49
Registered electors		11,631		
Majority		5,500	62.19	▼3.37
BN hold		Swing		

Negeri Sembilan state election, 1986
Party	Candidate	Votes	%	∆%
BN	Mohamad Yassin Bakar	5,793	82.78	▼0.04
PAS	Baharudin Leman	1,205	17.22	▲0.04
Total valid votes		6,998	100.00	
Total rejected ballots		269		
Unreturned ballots		0		
Turnout		7,267	74.05	▼4.20
Registered electors		9,814		
Majority		4,588	65.56	▼0.09
BN hold		Swing		

Negeri Sembilan state election, 1982
Party	Candidate	Votes	%	∆%
BN	Md. Salleh Md. Hashim	7,581	82.83	▲5.87
PAS	Jaafar Ahmad	1,572	17.17	▼5.87
Total valid votes		9,153	100.00	
Total rejected ballots		371		
Unreturned ballots		0		
Turnout		9,524	78.25	▲0.74
Registered electors		12,172		
Majority		6,009	65.65	▲11.75
BN hold		Swing		

Negeri Sembilan state election, 1978
Party	Candidate	Votes	%	∆%
BN	Md. Salleh Md. Hashim	5,282	76.95	▼4.55
PAS	Husin Takiman	1,582	23.05	▲23.05
Total valid votes		6,864	100.00	
Total rejected ballots		410		
Unreturned ballots		0		
Turnout		7,274	77.51	▼1.47
Registered electors		9,385		
Majority		3,700	53.90	▼9.11
BN hold		Swing		

Negeri Sembilan state election, 1974
Party	Candidate	Votes	%	∆%
BN	Md. Salleh Md. Hashim	5,196	81.51	▲81.51
Independent	Syed Zin Syed Husin	1,179	18.49	▲18.49
Total valid votes		6,375	100.00	
Total rejected ballots		152		
Unreturned ballots		0		
Turnout		6,527	78.98	▲4.94
Registered electors		8,264		
Majority		4,017	63.01	▲21.15
BN gain from Alliance		Swing		-

Negeri Sembilan state election, 1969
Party	Candidate	Votes	%	∆%
Alliance	Lim Heng Seng	3,682	70.93	▲4.50
DAP	Tan Ah Kau	1,509	29.07	▲29.07
Total valid votes		5,191	100.00	
Total rejected ballots		75		
Unreturned ballots		0		
Turnout		5,266	74.04	▼7.77
Registered electors		7,112		
Majority		2,173	41.86	▲9.01
Alliance hold		Swing		

Negeri Sembilan state election, 1964
Party	Candidate	Votes	%	∆%
Alliance	Lim Heng Seng	2,578	66.43	▲6.64
Socialist Front	Kwa Kim Poh	1,303	33.57	▼6.64
Total valid votes		3,881	100.00	
Total rejected ballots		185		
Unreturned ballots		0		
Turnout		4,066	81.81	▲3.56
Registered electors		4,970		
Majority		1,275	32.85	▲13.27
Alliance hold		Swing		

Negeri Sembilan state by-election, 3 February 1962 Upon the death of the incumbent, Fong Yew Wong
Party	Candidate	Votes	%	∆%
Alliance	Goh Poh Tah	2,058	59.79	▲5.83
Socialist Front	Tan Beng Soo	1,384	40.21	▲2.97
Total valid votes		3,442	100.00	
Total rejected ballots		62		
Unreturned ballots		0		
Turnout		3,504	78.25	▼4.51
Registered electors		4,478		
Majority		674	19.58	▲2.85
Alliance hold		Swing		

Negeri Sembilan state election, 1959
Party	Candidate	Votes	%
Alliance	Fong Yew Wong	1,742	53.97
Socialist Front	Tan Kim Geok	1,202	37.20
PMIP	Deraji Yassin	284	8.80
Total valid votes		3,228	100.00
Total rejected ballots		69	
Unreturned ballots		0	
Turnout		3,297	82.76
Registered electors		3,984	
Majority		540	16.73
This was a new constituency created.
