= Mohd Isam Mohd Isa =

Malaysian politician

Yang Berhormat Dato' Mohd Isam Mohd Isa DPNS PJK MP
- محمد عصام محمد عيسى
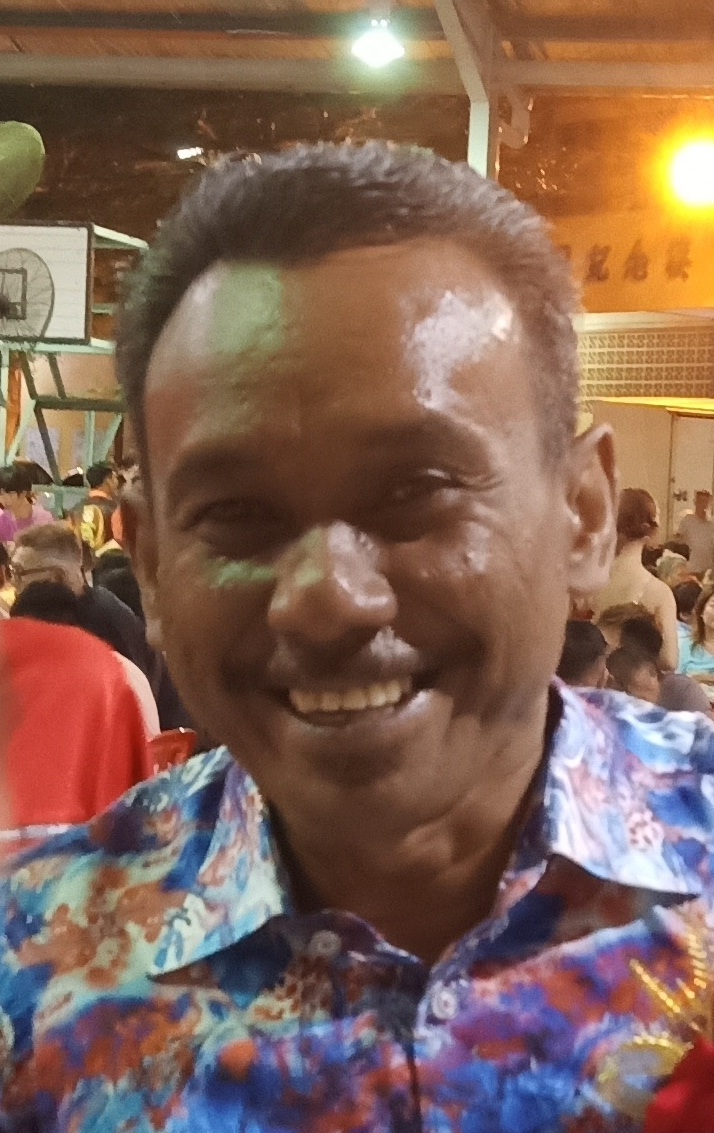
- Mohd Isam in 2026

Member of the Malaysian Parliament for Tampin
- Incumbent
- Assumed office 19 November 2022
- Preceded by: Hasan Bahrom (PH–AMANAH)
- Majority: 1,276 (2022)

Member of the Negeri Sembilan State Legislative Assembly for Gemencheh
- In office 9 May 2018 – 12 August 2023
- Preceded by: Mohd Kamil Abd Aziz (BN–UMNO)
- Succeeded by: Suhaimizan Bizar (BN–UMNO)
- Majority: 351 (2018)

Personal details
- Born: Mohd Isam bin Mohd Isa Gemencheh, Negeri Sembilan, Malaysia
- Party: United Malays National Organisation (UMNO)
- Other political affiliations: Barisan Nasional (BN)
- Spouse: Ruzita Zainal
- Education: University of Technology Malaysia (BEng)
- Occupation: Politician
- Website: Mohd Isam Mohd Isa on Facebook

Mohd Isam bin Mohd Isa (Jawi: محمد عصام محمد عيسى, Malay pronunciation: [mohamad isam]) is a Malaysian politician who has served as the Member of Parliament (MP) for Tampin since November 2022. He served as Member of the Negeri Sembilan State Legislative Assembly (MLA) for Gemencheh from May 2018 to August 2023. He is a member and Division Chief of Tampin of the United Malays National Organisation (UMNO), a component party of the Barisan Nasional (BN) coalition.

== Early life and education ==
Mohd Isam was born in Gemencheh, Negeri Sembilan and grew up in the state for most of his life. He holds various certificate in civil engineering such as a diploma from Politeknik Port Dickson and a certificate from Politeknik Sultan Haji Ahmad Shah, Kuantan, Pahang. He eventually continued his studies at the University of Technology Malaysia, Skudai, Johor where he graduated with a bachelor's degree in engineering.

== Political career ==
=== Member of the Negeri Sembilan State Legislative Assembly (2018–2023) ===
In the 2018 Negeri Sembilan state election, Mohd Isam was nominated by BN to contest for the Gemencheh state seat in his electoral debut. He won the seat and was elected to the Negeri Sembilan State Legislative Assembly as the Gemencheh MLA.

In the 2023 Negeri Sembilan state election, Mohd Isam was not renominated to contest and defend the Gemencheh seat.

=== Member of Parliament (since 2022) ===
In the 2022 general election, Mohd Isam was nominated by BN to contest for the Tampin federal seat. He defeated other candidates and was elected as the Tampin MP. Following his victory, the seat was regained by BN after the coalition lost it to Pakatan Harapan (PH) in the 2018 general election.

== Election results ==
Negeri Sembilan State Legislative Assembly
Year	Constituency	Candidate	Votes	Pct	Opponent(s)	Votes	Pct	Ballots cast	Majority	Turnout
2018	N35 Gemencheh	Mohd Isam Mohd Isa (UMNO)	6,963	47.38%	Saiful Adly Abdul Wahab (BERSATU)	6,612	44.99%	14,697	351	80.28%
2018	N35 Gemencheh	Mohd Isam Mohd Isa (UMNO)	6,963	47.38%	Ishak Maasin (PAS)	1,122	7.63%	14,697	351	80.28%

Parliament of Malaysia
Year	Constituency	Candidate	Votes	Pct	Opponent(s)	Votes	Pct	Ballots cast	Majority	Turnout
2022	P133 Tampin	Mohd Isam Mohd Isa (UMNO)	23,283	38.15%	Muhammad Faiz Fadzil (AMANAH)	22,007	36.06%	61,033	1,276	75.26
2022	P133 Tampin	Mohd Isam Mohd Isa (UMNO)	23,283	38.15%	Abdul Halim Abu Bakar (PAS)	14,962	24.51%	61,033	1,276	75.26
2022	P133 Tampin	Mohd Isam Mohd Isa (UMNO)	23,283	38.15%	Zamani Ibrahim (PEJUANG)	781	1.28%	61,033	1,276	75.26

== Honours ==
=== Honours of Malaysia ===
- Malaysia
  - Recipient of the 17th Yang di-Pertuan Agong Installation Medal (2024)
- Negeri Sembilan
  - Knight Commander of the Order of Loyalty to Negeri Sembilan (DPNS) – Dato' (2018)
  - Companion of the Order of Loyalty to Negeri Sembilan (DNS) (2016)
  - Member of the Order of Loyalty to Negeri Sembilan (ANS) (2010)
  - Recipient of the Meritorious Service Medal (PJK) (2004)
