= Ridzuan Ahmad =

Malaysian politician

Yang Berhormat Tuan Ridzuan Ahmad MLA

State Leader of the Opposition of Negeri Sembilan
- In office 9 October 2023 – 22 March 2024
- Monarch: Muhriz
- Menteri Besar: Aminuddin Harun
- Preceded by: Mohamad Hasan
- Succeeded by: Mohamad Hanifah Abu Baker
- Constituency: Gemas

Member of the Negeri Sembilan State Legislative Assembly for Gemas
- Incumbent
- Assumed office 12 August 2023
- Preceded by: Abdul Razak Said (BN–UMNO)
- Majority: 3,120 (2023)

Personal details
- Party: Malaysian United Indigenous Party (BERSATU) (till 2026) National Vision Party (Malaysia) (WAWASAN) (2026)
- Other political affiliations: Perikatan Nasional (PN) (till 2026)
- Occupation: Politician

Ridzuan bin Ahmad is a Malaysian politician. He has served as State Leader of the Opposition of Negeri Sembilan from October 2023 to March 2024. He is currently serving as Member of the Negeri Sembilan State Legislative Assembly (MLA) for Gemas since August 2023. He is a member of Malaysian United Indigenous Party which a member of Perikatan Nasional coalition.

== Political career ==
Ridzuan served as the BERSATU Tampin division chief before resigning on 11 July 2026, quitting BERSATU at the same time.

== Election results ==
Negeri Sembilan State Legislative Assembly
Year	Constituency	Candidate	Votes	Pct	Opponent(s)	Votes	Pct	Ballots cast	Majority	Turnout
2023	N34 Gemas	Ridzuan Ahmad (BERSATU)	11,653	57.73%	Abdul Razak Said (UMNO)	8,533	42.27%	20,453	3,120	68.99%
