= Gemencheh (state constituency) =

Constituency in Negeri Semblian, Malaysia

Gemencheh (N35)
Negeri Sembilan constituency

State constituency
- Legislature: Negeri Sembilan State Legislative Assembly
MLA
Suhaimizan Bizar
BN
- Constituency created: 1974
- First contested: 1974
- Last contested: 2026

Demographics
- Electors (2023): 24,602
- Area (km²): 409

N35 Gemencheh within Negeri Sembilan, as used for the 2023 and 2026 state elections

Gemencheh is a state constituency in Negeri Sembilan, Malaysia, that has been represented in the Negeri Sembilan State Legislative Assembly.

The state constituency was first contested in 1974 and is mandated to return a single Assemblyman to the Negeri Sembilan State Legislative Assembly under the first-past-the-post voting system.

== Demographics ==
Ethnic breakdown of Gemencheh's electorate as of 2026
1. Malay (62.5%)
2. Chinese (21.7%)
3. Indian (15.1%)
4. Other enthnicities (0.80%)

== History ==
=== Polling districts ===
According to the gazette issued on 23 July 2026, the Gemencheh constituency has a total of 15 polling districts.

State constituency	Polling districts	Code	Location
Gemencheh (N35)	Sungai Kelamah	133/35/01	SK Sungai Kelamah 'RKTP'
Gemencheh (N35)	Gememcheh Lama	133/35/02	SK Datuk Abdullah
Gemencheh (N35)	Gemencheh Bahru	133/35/03	SMK Dato' Mohd Taha; SJK (C) Sin Min Gemencheh
Gemencheh (N35)	Kampong Bahru Gedok	133/35/04	SJK (C) Kg Baru Gedok
Gemencheh (N35)	Gedok	133/35/05	SK Gedok
Gemencheh (N35)	Ayer Kuning Selatan	133/35/06	SJK (C) Air Kuning Selatan
Gemencheh (N35)	Bukit Jalor	133/35/07	SK (FELDA) Bukit Jalor
Gemencheh (N35)	Kampong Tengah	133/35/08	SK Air Kuning Selatan
Gemencheh (N35)	Kampung Mantai	133/35/09	Balai Raya Kampung Mantai
Gemencheh (N35)	Ladang Regent	133/35/10	SJK (T) Ladang Regent
Gemencheh (N35)	Pekan Batang Melaka	133/35/11	Balai Raya Kampong Punggor Batang Melaka
Gemencheh (N35)	Bukit Rotan Utara	133/35/12	SK Bukit Rokan Utara
Gemencheh (N35)	Bukit Rokan	133/35/13	SK Bukit Rokan (LKTP)
Gemencheh (N35)	Kampong Rokan	133/35/14	SK Rokan
Gemencheh (N35)	Kampong Sungai Jerneh	133/35/15	SK Sungai Jerneh

=== Representation history ===
Members of the Legislative Assembly for Gemencheh
Assembly	No	Years	Member	Party
Constituency created from Tampin
4th	N22	1974–1978	Mohamad Taha Talib	BN (UMNO)
5th	N22	1978–1982	Mohamad Taha Talib	BN (UMNO)
6th	N22	1982–1986	Waad Mansor	BN (UMNO)
7th	N10	1986–1990	Waad Mansor	BN (UMNO)
8th	N10	1990–1995	Waad Mansor	BN (UMNO)
9th	N10	1995–1999	Waad Mansor	BN (UMNO)
10th	N10	1999–2004	Waad Mansor	BN (UMNO)
11th	N35	2004–2008	Mohd Kamil Abd Aziz	BN (UMNO)
12th	N35	2008–2013	Mohd Kamil Abd Aziz	BN (UMNO)
13th	N35	2013–2018	Mohd Isam Mohd Isa	BN (UMNO)
14th	N35	2018–2023	Mohd Isam Mohd Isa	BN (UMNO)
15th	N35	2023–2026	Suhaimizan Bizar	BN (UMNO)
16th	N35	2026–present	Suhaimizan Bizar	BN (UMNO)

== Election results ==
Negeri Sembilan state election, 2026
Party	Candidate	Votes	%	∆%
BN	Suhaimizan Bizar	12,175	71.80	▲13.89
PH	Abd Latif Thamby	4,782	28.20	▲28.20
Total valid votes		16,957	100.00	
Total rejected ballots		191		
Unreturned ballots		14		
Turnout		17,162	68.88	▲6.68
Registered electors		24,916		
Majority		7,393	43.60	▲27.78
BN hold		Swing		

Negeri Sembilan state election, 2023
Party	Candidate	Votes	%	∆%
BN	Suhaimizan Bizar	8,905	57.91	▲10.53
PN	Tengku Abdullah Tengku Rakhman	6,471	42.09	▲42.09
Total valid votes		15,376	100.00	
Total rejected ballots		123		
Unreturned ballots		20		
Turnout		15,519	63.08	▼17.20
Registered electors		24,602		
Majority		2,434	15.82	▲13.43
BN hold		Swing		

Negeri Sembilan state election, 2018
Party	Candidate	Votes	%	∆%
BN	Mohd Isam Mohd Isa	6,963	47.38	▼14.68
PH	Ustaz Saiful Adly Abdul Wahab	6,612	44.99	▲44.99
PAS	Ishak Maasin	1,122	7.63	▼30.31
Total valid votes		14,697	100.00	
Total rejected ballots		249		
Unreturned ballots		71		
Turnout		15,017	80.28	▼3.05
Registered electors		18,705		
Majority		351	2.39	▼21.73
BN hold		Swing		

Negeri Sembilan state election, 2013
Party	Candidate	Votes	%	∆%
BN	Mohd Isam Mohd Isa	7,782	62.06	▼4.21
PAS	Mohd Nor Yassin	4,757	37.94	▲4.21
Total valid votes		12,539	100.00	
Total rejected ballots		286		
Unreturned ballots		0		
Turnout		12,825	83.33	▲9.65
Registered electors		15,390		
Majority		3,025	24.12	▼8.42
BN hold		Swing		
Source(s) "Federal Government Gazette - Notice of Contested Election, State Legislative Assembly for the State of Negeri Sembilan [P.U. (B) 193/2013]" (PDF). Attorney General's Chambers of Malaysia. 26 April 2013. "Federal Government Gazette - Results of Contested Election and Statements of the Poll after the Official Addition of Votes, State Constituencies for the State of Negeri Sembilan [P.U. (B) 234/2013]" (PDF). Attorney General's Chambers of Malaysia. 22 May 2013.

Negeri Sembilan state election, 2008
Party	Candidate	Votes	%	∆%
BN	Mohd Kamil Abd Aziz	6,600	66.27	▼4.09
PAS	Zakaria Khalim	3,359	33.73	▲4.09
Total valid votes		9,959	100.00	
Total rejected ballots		260		
Unreturned ballots		0		
Turnout		10,219	73.68	▲0.52
Registered electors		13,870		
Majority		3,241	32.54	▼8.18
Majority		3,241	32.54	
BN hold		Swing		

Negeri Sembilan state election, 2004
Party	Candidate	Votes	%	∆%
BN	Mohd Kamil Abd Aziz	6,514	70.36	▲13.45
PAS	Zakaria Khalim	2,744	29.64	▼13.45
Total valid votes		9,258	100.00	
Total rejected ballots		284		
Unreturned ballots		10		
Turnout		9,552	73.16	▲1.11
Registered electors		13,057		
Majority		3,770	40.72	▲26.89
BN hold		Swing		

Negeri Sembilan state election, 1999
Party	Candidate	Votes	%	∆%
BN	Waad Mansor	4,997	56.91	▼18.25
PAS	Ali Maidin Kutty	3,783	43.09	▲43.09
Total valid votes		8,780	100.00	
Total rejected ballots		317		
Unreturned ballots		7		
Turnout		9,104	72.05	▼2.25
Registered electors		12,636		
Majority		1,214	13.83	▼46.52
BN hold		Swing		

Negeri Sembilan state election, 1995
Party	Candidate	Votes	%	∆%
BN	Waad Mansor	6,477	75.17	▲4.84
S46	Baharuddin Arif Siri	1,277	14.82	▼14.86
Independent	Zolkapli Kassim	863	10.02	▲10.02
Total valid votes		8,617	100.00	
Total rejected ballots		259		
Unreturned ballots		32		
Turnout		8,908	74.30	▼4.64
Registered electors		11,990		
Majority		5,200	60.35	▲19.70
BN hold		Swing		

Negeri Sembilan state election, 1990
Party	Candidate	Votes	%	∆%
BN	Waad Mansor	6,239	70.32	▼3.48
S46	Hamzah Maarof	2,633	29.68	▲29.68
Total valid votes		8,872	100.00	
Total rejected ballots		353		
Unreturned ballots		10		
Turnout		9,235	78.94	▲4.65
Registered electors		11,699		
Majority		3,606	40.64	▼6.96
BN hold		Swing		

Negeri Sembilan state election, 1986
Party	Candidate	Votes	%	∆%
BN	Waad Mansor	5,493	73.80	▲12.17
Independent	Hashim (Lassim) Pilus	1,950	26.20	▼1.32
Total valid votes		7,443	100.00	
Total rejected ballots		363		
Unreturned ballots		0		
Turnout		7,806	74.29	▲4.68
Registered electors		10,508		
Majority		3,543	47.60	▲13.49
BN hold		Swing		

Negeri Sembilan state election, 1982
Party	Candidate	Votes	%	∆%
BN	Waad Mansor	5,787	61.63	▼16.82
Independent	Hashim Pilus	2,584	27.52	▲27.52
DAP	Lee Kong Chon	687	7.32	▲7.32
PAS	Mohd. Ali Napiah Ismail	332	3.54	▼18.02
Total valid votes		9,390	100.00	
Total rejected ballots		65		
Unreturned ballots		0		
Turnout		9,455	69.61	▼9.96
Registered electors		13,583		
Majority		3,203	34.11	▼22.79
BN hold		Swing		

Negeri Sembilan state election, 1978
Party	Candidate	Votes	%	∆%
BN	Mohd Taha Abdul Talib	6,723	78.45	
PAS	Mohd Lasim Ma'adah	1,847	21.55	
Total valid votes		8,570	100.00	
Total rejected ballots		640		
Unreturned ballots		0		
Turnout		9,210	79.57	▲79.57
Registered electors		11,575		
Majority		4,876	56.90	▲56.90
BN hold		Swing		

Negeri Sembilan state election, 1974
Party	Candidate	Votes	%
On the nomination day, Mohd Taha Abdul Talib won uncontested.
BN	Mohd Taha Abdul Talib		
Total valid votes			
Total rejected ballots			
Unreturned ballots			
Turnout			
Registered electors		9,817	
Majority			
This was a new constituency created.
