= Government of Negeri Sembilan =

Executive and legislative authorities governing the Malaysian state of Negeri Sembilan

State Government of Negeri Sembilan
- Kerajaan Negeri Sembilan
- State government
- Coat of arms of Negeri Sembilan

Overview
- Established: 31 August 1957 (69 years ago)
- State: Negeri Sembilan
- Leader: Menteri Besar
- Appointed by: Yang di-Pertuan Besar
- Main organ: Negeri Sembilan State Executive Council
- Responsible to: Negeri Sembilan State Legislative Assembly
- Annual budget: RM 640 million (2026)
- Headquarters: Wisma Negeri Sembilan, Seremban
- Website: www.ns.gov.my

The Government of Negeri Sembilan, officially the State Government of Negeri Sembilan, refers to the government authority of the Malaysian state of Negeri Sembilan. The state government adheres to and is created by both the Federal Constitution of Malaysia, the supreme law of Malaysia, and the Laws of the Constitution of Negeri Sembilan 1959, the supreme law in Negeri Sembilan. The government of Negeri Sembilan is based in Seremban, the state's capital city.

The state government consists of only two branches – executive and legislative. The Negeri Sembilan State Executive Council forms the executive branch, whilst the Negeri Sembilan State Legislative Assembly is the legislature of the state government. Negeri Sembilan's head of government is the Menteri Besar. The state government does not have a judiciary branch, as Malaysia's judicial system is a federalised system operating uniformly throughout the country.

== Executive ==
=== Head of government ===
The Menteri Besar is the head of government in Negeri Sembilan. He is officially appointed by the Yang di-Pertuan Besar, Negeri Sembilan's head of state, on the basis of the latter's judgement that the former commands the confidence of the majority of the State Assemblymen in the Negeri Sembilan State Legislative Assembly. The Menteri Besar and his Executive Council shall be collectively responsible to Legislative Assembly. The Office of the Menteri Besar is situated inside Wisma Negeri Sembilan in Seremban.

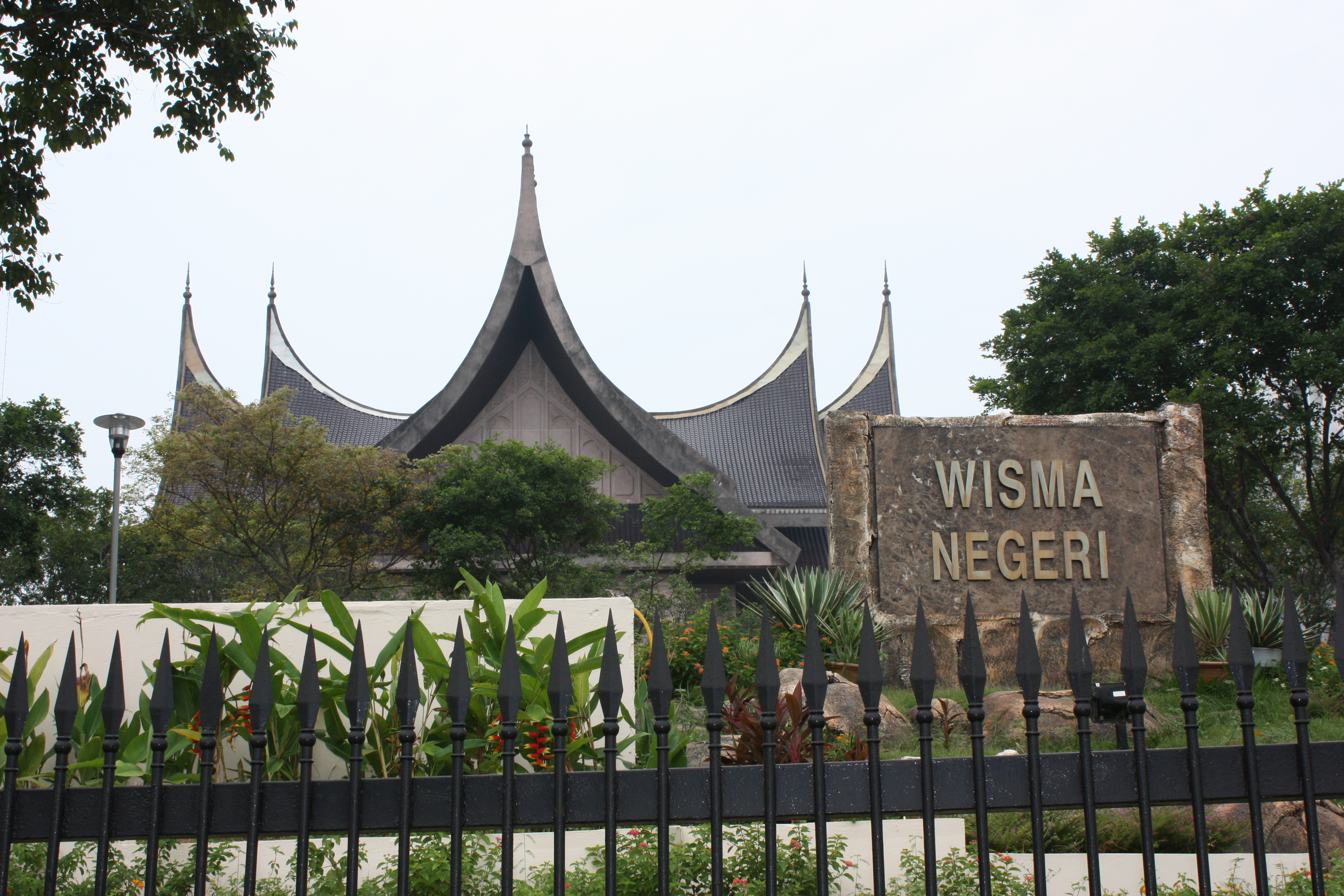
The Wisma Negeri houses the Office of the Menteri Besar of Negeri Sembilan, as well as other state government offices.

The Menteri Besar of Negeri Sembilan is Ismail Lasim of the Barisan Nasional (BN) coalition that holds the most seats in the State Legislative Assembly among the three coalitions in the state assembly. Ismail assumed office on 2 August 2026, having been elected as a Member of the State Legislative Assembly in the 2008 state election.

=== Cabinet ===
The Negeri Sembilan State Executive Council forms the executive branch of the Negeri Sembilan state government and is analogous in function to the Malaysian federal Cabinet. The Executive Council is led by the Menteri Besar and made up of between four and 10 other State Assemblymen from the Negeri Sembilan State Legislative Assembly. Aside from these, three other ex officio members of the Executive Council are the State Secretary, the State Legal Adviser and the State Financial Officer.

Following the 2026 Negeri Sembilan state election, Ismail Lasim was appointed as the Menteri Besar after Barisan Nasional (BN) and Perikatan Nasional (PN) were elected to power and formed a coalition state government. However, Tuanku Muhriz has revoked all the exco membership due to breach of oath.

BN (1)
- UMNO (1)

Members from 7 August 2026 to 20 September 2026:

Name	Portfolio	Party	Constituency	Term start	Term end
Dato' Ismail Lasim (Menteri Besar)	Islamic Affairs; Investment; Security; Finance; Land and Natural Resources; Infrastructure and Public Facilities; FELDA	BN (UMNO)	Juasseh	2 August 2026	Incumbent
Suhaimizan Bizar	Health; National Unity; Information; National Unity and Integration; Non-Government Organization (NGO)	BN (UMNO)	Gemencheh	7 August 2026	21 September 2026
Dato' Mustapha Nagoor	Youth and Sports	BN (UMNO)	Palong	7 August 2026	21 September 2026
Dato' Mohd Razi Mohd Ali	Agriculture, Food Security and Cost Living	BN (UMNO)	Sungai Lui	7 August 2026	21 September 2026
Dato' Zaifulbahri Idris	Education; Human Capital	BN (UMNO)	Chembong	7 August 2026	21 September 2026
Datuk Mohd Asna Amin	Industry; Science, Technology and Innovation; Digital	BN (UMNO)	Lenggeng	7 August 2026	21 September 2026
Dato' Mohd Faizal Ramli	Rural Development	BN (UMNO)	Linggi	7 August 2026	21 September 2026
Siti Nur Umirah Hashim	Women's affairs; Social welfare	BN (UMNO)	Labu	7 August 2026	21 September 2026
Siow Kong Choon	Housing and Local Government; Non-Muslim Affairs	BN (MCA)	Chennah	7 August 2026	21 September 2026
Mohd Fairuz Mohd Isa	Consumer Affairs; Human Resources; Climate Change; Cooperatives and Consumerism	PN (PAS)	Serting	7 August 2026	21 September 2026
Datuk Razali Abu Samah	Tourism; Arts and Culture	PN (WAWASAN)	Sikamat	7 August 2026	21 September 2026

=== Ex officio members ===
Position	Name
State Secretary	Mohd Zafir Ibrahim
State Financial Officer	Johani Hassan
State Legal Advisor	Iskandar Ali Dewa

== Legislature ==
Composition of the Negeri Sembilan State Legislative Assembly after the 2026 Negeri Sembilan state election. Barisan Nasional (BN) holds 18 seats. Pakatan Harapan (PH) holds 11 seats. Perikatan Nasional (PN) holds 7 seats.

The Negeri Sembilan State Legislative Assembly is the legislative branch of the Negeri Sembilan state government. The unicameral legislature consists of 36 seats that represent the 36 state constituencies within Negeri Sembilan, with each constituency being represented by an elected State Assemblyman. The Legislative Assembly convenes at the Wisma Negeri in Seremban.

The legislature has a maximum mandate of five years by law and follows a multi-party system; the ruling party (or coalition) is elected through a first-past-the-post system. The Yang di-Pertuan Besar may dissolve the legislature at any time and usually does so upon the advice of the Menteri Besar.

A Speaker is elected by the Legislative Assembly to preside over the proceedings and debates of the legislature. The Speaker may or may not be an elected State Assemblyman; in the case of the latter, the elected Speaker shall become a member of the Legislative Assembly additional to the elected State Assemblymen already in the legislature.

== Negeri Sembilan State Government Secretariat ==
- Internal Audit Unit
- Corporate Unit
- State Key Result Area Unit
- Integrity Unit

=== Development Cluster ===
- State Economic Planning Unit
- Privatisation and Investment Unit
- Local Government Division
- Housing Division
- Water Regulatory Board

=== Management Cluster ===
- Human Resources Management Division
- Management Service Division
- Office of Menteri Besar
- Negeri Sembilan State Legislative Assembly
- Information Technology Division
- Negeri Sembilan State Sports Council
- State Development Office
- Functions and Protocol Management Division

== Depertments, statutory bodies and subsidiaries ==
=== Departments ===
- Negeri Sembilan State Financial Office
- Negeri Sembilan Public Works Department
- Office of Lands and Mines Negeri Sembilan
- Negeri Sembilan Irrigation and Drainage Department
- Negeri Sembilan State Forestry Department
- Negeri Sembilan State Agriculture Department
- Negeri Sembilan Social Welfare Department
- Negeri Sembilan Town and Country Planning Department
- Department of Veterinary Services of Negeri Sembilan
- Negeri Sembilan State Mufti Department
- Negeri Sembilan State Islamic Religious Affairs Department
- Negeri Sembilan Syariah Judiciary Department
- Negeri Sembilan Syariah Prosecution Department

=== Statutory bodies ===
- Negeri Sembilan State Islamic Religious Council (MAINS)
- Negeri Sembilan State Museum Board (LMNS)
- NS Corporation (NS Corp)
- Negeri Sembilan Public Library Corporation (PPANS)
- Negeri Sembilan Foundation (YNS)
- Negeri Sembilan State Development Corporation (PKNNS)

=== Subsidiaries ===
- Menteri Besar Incorporated
  - Syarikat Air Negeri Sembilan
  - Negeri Sembilan Investment Centre
  - NS Capital Advance Sdn Bhd
  - Lambang Tunas Sdn Bhd
  - Emerald Spirit Sdn Bhd (77.25%)
  - YNS Management Sdn Bhd (51%)
  - Kumpulan Akademi YNS Sdn Bhd (51%)
- Negeri Sembilan State Development Corporation
  - Emerald Spirit Sdn Bhd (22.5%)
  - Negeri Roadstone Sdn Bhd (80%)
  - Pati Nilai Quarry Sdn Bhd (70%)
  - NR Concrete (35%)
  - Gobuilders Netsoft (30%)

== Districts and Lands Offices ==
- Jelebu District
- Jempol District
- Kuala Pilah District
- Port Dickson District
- Rembau District
- Seremban District
- Tampin District
  - Gemas Subdistrict

== Local governments ==
- Jelebu District Council
- Jempol Municipal Council
- Kuala Pilah District Council
- Port Dickson Municipal Council
- Rembau District Council
- Seremban City Council
- Tampin District Council
