= Jempol (federal constituency) =

Constituency of Negeri Sembilan, Malaysia

Jempol (P127)
Negeri Sembilan constituency

Federal constituency
- Legislature: Dewan Rakyat
- MP: Shamshulkahar Mohd. Deli; BN
- Constituency created: 1984
- First contested: 1986
- Last contested: 2022

Demographics
- Population (2020): 108,379
- Electors (2026): 96,716
- Area (km²): 1,125
- Pop. density (per km²): 96.3

Jempol is a federal constituency in Jempol District, Negeri Sembilan, Malaysia, that has been represented in the Dewan Rakyat since 1986.

The federal constituency was created in the 1984 redistribution and is mandated to return a single member to the Dewan Rakyat under the first past the post voting system.

== Demographics ==
Ethnic breakdown of Jempol's electorate as of 2022
1. Malay (64.8%)
2. Chinese (22.0%)
3. Indian (12.4%)
4. Other ethnicities (0.70%)

As of 2020, Jempol has a population of 108,379 people.

Age breakdown of Jempol's electorate as of 2022
1. 18-20 (5.02%)
2. 21-29 (19.4%)
3. 30-39 (27.3%)
4. 40-49 (16.3%)
5. 50-59 (11.3%)
6. 60-69 (13.4%)
7. 70-79 (5.81%)
8. 80-89 (1.37%)
9. above 90 (0.22%)
Gender breakdown of Jempol's electorate as of 2022
1. Male (49.0%)
2. Female (51.0%)

== History ==
=== Polling districts ===
According to the gazette issued on 23 July 2026, the Jempol constituency has a total of 35 polling districts.

State constituency	Polling districts	Code	Location
Serting（N05）	Serting Ulu	127/05/01	SK Serting Ulu
Serting（N05）	Kampong Serting Tengah	127/05/02	SMA Dato' Haji Mustafa
Serting（N05）	Kampong Serting Hilir	127/05/03	SK Tunku Muda Serting; SK Serting Hilir
Serting（N05）	Lubok Gadong	127/05/04	Pusat Komuniti Desa Serting Hilir
Serting（N05）	Mahsan Jaya	127/05/05	SJK (C) Kg Mashan; SMK Bahau 2
Serting（N05）	FELDA Raja Alias	127/05/06	SMK Seri Jempol; SK Serting (FELDA); SK FELDA Raja Alias 3
Serting（N05）	Bandar Baru Serting Hilir	127/05/07	SK Serting Hilir Kompleks; SMK Serting Hilir Kompleks; SK (FELDA) Serting Hilir 2
Serting（N05）	Kampong Geddes	127/05/08	SJK (T) Ladang Geedes
Serting（N05）	Kampong Geddes Tengah	127/05/09	SJK (C) Chung Hua
Serting（N05）	Ladang Sungai Sebaling	127/05/10	SJK (T) Ldg Sg Sebaling
Serting（N05）	Bandar Seri Jempol	127/05/11	SK Dato Penghulu Luak Jempol; SMK Bandar Baru Serting
Palong (N06)	Palong 14, 15 & 16	127/06/01	SK Palong 14
Palong (N06)	Palong 8	127/06/02	SK Palong 8 (FELDA)
Palong (N06)	Palong 12 & 13	127/06/03	SK (FELDA) Palong 12
Palong (N06)	Palong 7	127/06/04	SK (FELDA) Palong 7
Palong (N06)	Palong 9, 10 & 11	127/02/05	SMK Palong 11; SK (FELDA) Palong 9
Palong (N06)	Palong 6	127/06/06	SMK Seri Perpatih (Palong 6)
Palong (N06)	Palong 5	127/06/07	SK (FELDA) Palong 5
Palong (N06)	Palong 4	127/06/08	SK (FELDA) Palong 4
Palong (N06)	Palong 3	127/06/09	SK (FELDA) Palong 3
Jeram Padang (N07)	Ladang Bahau	127/07/01	SJK (T) Ldg Bahau
Jeram Padang (N07)	Taman Jaya	127/07/02	SJK (T) Ladang St Helier; SJK (C) Middleton
Jeram Padang (N07)	Bukit Rokan Barat	127/07/03	SK Bukit Rokan Barat
Jeram Padang (N07)	Jeram Padang	127/07/04	SJK (T) Ldg Sialang
Jeram Padang (N07)	Ladang Middleton	127/07/05	SJK (T) Ldg Middleton
Jeram Padang (N07)	Ladang Klepin	127/07/06	SJK (T) Ldg Klepin
Jeram Padang (N07)	Ladang Bukit Pilah	127/07/07	SK Rompin
Jeram Padang (N07)	Rompin	127/07/08	Dewan New Rompin
Jeram Padang (N07)	Palong 2	127/07/09	SK (FELDA) Palong 2
Jeram Padang (N07)	Palong 1	127/07/10	SK (FELDA) Palong 1
Bahau (N08)	Kampong Bukit Perah	127/08/01	Dewan Orang Ramai Batu Kikir
Bahau (N08)	Kampong Batu Kikir	127/08/02	SMK Batu Kikir
Bahau (N08)	Kampong Lonek	127/08/03	Balai Raya Kampong Lonek
Bahau (N08)	Kuala Jempol	127/08/04	SK Jempol
Bahau (N08)	Kuala Kampung Kepis	127/08/05	SK Kuala Kepis
Bahau (N08)	Kampung Jambu Lapan	127/08/06	SMK Datuk Mansor
Bahau (N08)	Taman ACBE	127/08/07	SJK (C) Bahau
Bahau (N08)	Pekan Bahau	127/08/08	SK St Aidan
Bahau (N08)	Kampong Indah	127/08/09	SJK (C) Chi Wen
Bahau (N08)	Kampong Bakar Batu	127/08/10	SMK Bahau; SMJK Chi Wen

=== Representation history ===
Members of Parliament for Jempol
Parliament	No	Years	Member	Party	Vote Share
Constituency created from Jelebu, Kuala Pilah and Tampin
7th	P104	1986–1990	Mohd Khalid Mohd Yunus (محمّد خالد محمّد يونس)	BN (UMNO)	17,467; 66.23%
8th	P104	1990–1995	Mohd Khalid Mohd Yunus (محمّد خالد محمّد يونس)	BN (UMNO)	20,609; 60.20%
9th	P114	1995–1999	Mohd Khalid Mohd Yunus (محمّد خالد محمّد يونس)	BN (UMNO)	24,653; 73.37%
10th	P114	1999–2004	Mohd Khalid Mohd Yunus (محمّد خالد محمّد يونس)	BN (UMNO)	23,727; 66.77%
11th	P127	2004–2008	Mohd Isa Abdul Samad (محمّد عيسى عبدالصمد)	BN (UMNO)	25,360; 73.96%
12th	P127	2008–2013	Lilah Yasin (ليلى يسٓ)	BN (UMNO)	25,294; 66.10%
13th	P127	2013–2018	Mohd Isa Abdul Samad (محمّد عيسى عبدالصمد)	BN (UMNO)	31,124; 58.05%
14th	P127	2018–2022	Mohd Salim Shariff (محمّد سليم محمّد شريف)	BN (UMNO)	26,819; 46.83%
15th	P127	2022–present	Shamshulkahar Mohd. Deli (شمس القهار محمّد دلي)	BN (UMNO)	30,138; 41.98%

=== State constituency ===
Parliamentary constituency	State constituency						
Parliamentary constituency	1955–59*	1959–1974	1974–1986	1986–1995	1995–2004	2004–2018	2018–present
Jempol				Bahau			
Jempol				Batu Kikir			
Jempol					Jeram Padang		
Jempol				Palong			
Jempol				Serting			

=== Historical boundaries ===
State Constituency	Area			
State Constituency	1984	1994	2003	2018
Bahau	Bahau; Kampung Baru Mahsan; Kampung Taman Jaya; Taman Margosa Maju; Taman Meranti	Bahau; Batu Kikir; Jambu Lapan; Taman Kepayang; Taman Meranti		
Batu Kikir	Batu Kikir; Juasseh; Kampung Majau; Kampung Terentang; Taman Intan			
Jeram Padang		Ladang Bahau; Jeram Padang; Kampung Taman Jaya; Rompin; Taman Awana Indah	FELDA Palong 1 & 2; Jeram Padang; Kampung Taman Jaya; Rompin; Taman Awana Indah	
Palong	FELDA Palong 1 - 6; FELDA Palong 7 & 8; FELDA Palong 9 - 11; FELDA Palong 12 & 13; FELDA Palong 14 - 16		FELDA Palong 3 - 6; FELDA Palong 7 & 8; FELDA Palong 9 - 11; FELDA Palong 12 & 13; FELDA Palong 14 - 16	
Serting	Bandar Seri Jempol; Kampung Baru Mahsan; Kampung Bayai Baru; Kampung Serting Tengah; Taman Tunku Puan Chik	Bandar Seri Jempol; Kampung Baru Mahsan; Kampung Bayai Baru; Kampung Serting Tengah; Serting Hilir	Bandar Seri Jempol; Kampung Bayai Baru; Kampung Serting Tengah; Ladang Geddes; Serting Hilir	

=== Current state assembly members ===
No.	State Constituency	Member	Coalition (Party)
N05	Serting	Mohd Fairuz Mohd Isa	PN (PAS)
N06	Palong	Mustapha Nagoor	BN (UMNO)
N07	Jeram Padang	Mohd Zaidy Abdul Kadir	BN (UMNO)
N08	Bahau	Teo Kok Seong	PH (DAP)

=== Local governments & postcodes ===
No.	State Constituency	Local Government	Postcode
N05	Serting	Jempol Municipal Council	72100 Bahau; 72120 Bandar Seri Jempol; 72300 Simpang Pertang; 73400 Gemas; 73430, 73440, 73450, 73460, 73470 Pusat Bandar Palong; 73500 Rompin
N06	Palong	Jempol Municipal Council	72100 Bahau; 72120 Bandar Seri Jempol; 72300 Simpang Pertang; 73400 Gemas; 73430, 73440, 73450, 73460, 73470 Pusat Bandar Palong; 73500 Rompin
N07	Jeram Padang	Jempol Municipal Council	72100 Bahau; 72120 Bandar Seri Jempol; 72300 Simpang Pertang; 73400 Gemas; 73430, 73440, 73450, 73460, 73470 Pusat Bandar Palong; 73500 Rompin
N08	Bahau	Jempol Municipal Council	72100 Bahau; 72120 Bandar Seri Jempol; 72300 Simpang Pertang; 73400 Gemas; 73430, 73440, 73450, 73460, 73470 Pusat Bandar Palong; 73500 Rompin

== Election results ==
Malaysian general election, 2022
Party	Candidate	Votes	%	∆%
BN	Shamshulkahar Mohd. Deli	30,138	41.98	▼4.85
PH	Norwani Ahmad	24,281	33.82	▲33.82
PN	Norafendy Mohd Salleh	16,722	23.29	▲23.29
PEJUANG	Mohd Khalid Mohd Yunus	654	0.91	▲0.91
Total valid votes		71,795	100.00	
Total rejected ballots		834		
Unreturned ballots		179		
Turnout		72,808	75.99	▼5.15
Registered electors		95,813		
Majority		5,857	8.16	▲5.31
BN hold		Swing		
Source(s) https://lom.agc.gov.my/ilims/upload/portal/akta/outputp/1753263/PUB615%20PARLIMEN%20NEGERI%20SEMBILAN.pdf

Malaysian general election, 2018
Party	Candidate	Votes	%	∆%
BN	Mohd Salim Shariff	26,819	46.83	▼11.22
PKR	Kamarulzaman Kamdias	25,188	43.98	▲43.98
PAS	Mustaffa Daharun	5,267	9.19	▼32.76
Total valid votes		57,274	100.00	
Total rejected ballots		1,025		
Unreturned ballots		224		
Turnout		58,523	81.14	▼2.98
Registered electors		72,122		
Majority		1,631	2.85	▼13.25
BN hold		Swing		
Source(s) "His Majesty's Government Gazette - Notice of Contested Election, Parliament for the State of Negeri Sembilan [P.U. (B) 242/2018]" (PDF). Attorney General's Chambers of Malaysia. 3 May 2018. "Federal Government Gazette - Results of Contested Election and Statements of the Poll after the Official Addition of Votes, Parliamentary Constituencies for the State of Negeri Sembilan [P.U. (B) 316/2018]" (PDF). Attorney General's Chambers of Malaysia. 28 May 2018.

Malaysian general election, 2013
Party	Candidate	Votes	%	∆%
BN	Mohd Isa Abdul Samad	31,124	58.05	▼8.05
PAS	Wan Aishah Wan Ariffin	22,495	41.95	▲8.05
Total valid votes		53,619	100.00	
Total rejected ballots		1,082		
Unreturned ballots		157		
Turnout		54,858	84.12	▲10.59
Registered electors		65,213		
Majority		8,629	16.10	▼16.10
BN hold		Swing		
Source(s) "Federal Government Gazette - Notice of Contested Election, Parliament for the State of Negeri Sembilan [P.U. (B) 179/2013]" (PDF). Attorney General's Chambers of Malaysia. 26 April 2013. Archived from the original (PDF) on 2019-12-29. "Federal Government Gazette - Results of Contested Election and Statements of the Poll after the Official Addition of Votes, Parliamentary Constituencies for the State of Negeri Sembilan [P.U. (B) 220/2013]" (PDF). Attorney General's Chambers of Malaysia. 22 May 2013.

Malaysian general election, 2008
Party	Candidate	Votes	%	∆%
BN	Lilah Yasin	25,294	66.10	▼7.86
PAS	Siti Meriam Naam	12,974	33.90	▲7.86
Total valid votes		38,268	100.00	
Total rejected ballots		1,054		
Unreturned ballots				
Turnout		39,322	73.53	▲0.37
Registered electors		53,478		
Majority		12,320	32.20	▼15.72
BN hold		Swing		

Malaysian general election, 2004
Party	Candidate	Votes	%	∆%
BN	Mohd Isa Abdul Samad	26,360	73.96	▲7.19
PAS	Mohamad Fozi Md Zain	9,280	26.04	▼7.19
Total valid votes		35,640	100.00	
Total rejected ballots		1,050		
Unreturned ballots		295		
Turnout		36,985	73.16	▼0.49
Registered electors		50,553		
Majority		17,080	47.92	▲13.48
BN hold		Swing		

Malaysian general election, 1999
Party	Candidate	Votes	%	∆%
BN	Mohd Khalid Mohd Yunus	23,727	66.77	▼6.60
PAS	Abd. Rahim Yusof	11,808	33.23	▲33.23
Total valid votes		35,535	100.00	
Total rejected ballots		1,006		
Unreturned ballots		5		
Turnout		36,546	73.65	▼1.15
Registered electors		49,617		
Majority		11,919	34.44	▼12.30
BN hold		Swing		

Malaysian general election, 1995
Party	Candidate	Votes	%	∆%
BN	Mohd Khalid Mohd Yunus	24,653	73.37	▲13.17
S46	Abdul Aziz Abdullah	8,949	26.63	▼13.17
Total valid votes		33,602	100.00	
Total rejected ballots		1,473		
Unreturned ballots		176		
Turnout		35,251	74.80	▼3.46
Registered electors		47,127		
Majority		15,704	46.74	▲26.34
BN hold		Swing		

Malaysian general election, 1990
Party	Candidate	Votes	%	∆%
BN	Mohd Khalid Mohd Yunus	20,609	60.20	▼6.03
S46	Abdul Aziz Abdullah	13,625	39.80	▲39.40
Total valid votes		34,234	100.00	
Total rejected ballots		1,032		
Unreturned ballots		0		
Turnout		35,266	78.26	▲3.35
Registered electors		45,061		
Majority		6,984	20.40	▼18.99
BN hold		Swing		

Malaysian general election, 1986
Party	Candidate	Votes	%
BN	Mohd Khalid Mohd Yunus	17,467	66.23
DAP	Tham Kin Sung	7,078	26.84
PAS	Mohamad Abdullah	1,828	6.93
Total valid votes		26,373	100.00
Total rejected ballots		231	
Unreturned ballots		0	
Turnout		26,604	74.91
Registered electors		35,516	
Majority		10,389	39.39
This was a new constituency created.
