= Salim Sharif =

Malaysian politician

Yang Berbahagia Datuk Seri Mohd Salim Mohd Sharif SMW DBNS PJK
- محمّد سليم محمّد شريف

Chairman of the Rubber Industry Smallholders Development Authority
- In office 1 May 2020 – 15 December 2022
- Minister: Abdul Latiff Ahmad (2020–2021); Mahdzir Khalid (2021–2022); Ahmad Zahid Hamidi (2022)
- Director-General: Ahmad Shabri Zainuddin Wan Mohamad
- Preceded by: Rosely Kusip
- Succeeded by: Noraini Ahmad

Member of the Malaysian Parliament for Jempol
- In office 9 May 2018 – 19 November 2022
- Preceded by: Mohd Isa Abdul Samad (BN–UMNO)
- Succeeded by: Shamshulkahar Mohd Deli (BN–UMNO)
- Majority: 1,631 (2018)

Senator Elected by the Negeri Sembilan State Legislative Assembly
- In office 21 April 2014 – 28 April 2017 Serving with Chong Sin Woon
- Monarchs: Abdul Halim (2014–2016); Muhammad V (2016–2017)
- Prime Minister: Najib Razak
- Preceded by: Mohammed Najib Abdullah (BN–UMNO)
- Succeeded by: Ahmad Azam Hamzah (PH–PKR)

Faction represented in Dewan Rakyat
- 2018–2022: Barisan Nasional

Faction represented in Dewan Negara
- 2014–2018: Barisan Nasional

Personal details
- Born: Mohd. Salim bin Sharif @ Mohd. Sharif Jempol, Negeri Sembilan, Malaysia
- Citizenship: Malaysia
- Party: United Malays National Organisation (UMNO)
- Other political affiliations: Barisan Nasional (BN)
- Spouse: Fazidah Abdul Rahman
- Children: 5
- Education: University College of Agroscience Malaysia
- Occupation: Politician

Mohd Salim bin Sharif @ Mohd Sharif (Jawi: محمّد سليم بن محمّد شريف) is a Malaysian politician who had served as Chairman of Rubber Industry Smallholders Development Authority (RISDA) from May 2020 to December 2022, Member of Parliament (MP) for Jempol from May 2018 to November 2022 and as a Senator from April 2014 to April 2017. He is a member of the United Malays National Organisation (UMNO), a component party of the ruling Barisan Nasional (BN) coalition. He had served as the Division Chief of UMNO of Jempol from 2013 to 2023.

== Election results ==
Parliament of Malaysia
Year	Constituency	Candidate	Votes	Pct	Opponent(s)	Votes	Pct	Ballots cast	Majority	Turnout
2018	P127 Jempol	Mohd. Salim Mohd. Sharif (UMNO)	26,819	46.83%	Kamarulzaman Kamdias (BERSATU)	25,188	43.98%	58,523	1,631	84.12%
2018	P127 Jempol	Mohd. Salim Mohd. Sharif (UMNO)	26,819	46.83%	Mustaffa Daharun (PAS)	5,267	9.19%	58,523	1,631	84.12%

== Honours ==
- Federal Territory (Malaysia)
  - Grand Commander of the Order of the Territorial Crown (SMW) – Datuk Seri (2022)
- Negeri Sembilan
  - Knight of the Order of Loyal Service to Negeri Sembilan (DBNS) – Dato' (2010)
  - Recipient of the Meritorious Service Medal (PJK) (1994)

== See also ==
- Members of the Dewan Negara, 13th Malaysian Parliament
- List of people who have served in both Houses of the Malaysian Parliament
