= 2018 Port Dickson by-election =

By-election in Malaysia in 2018

- 13 October 2018

P132 Port Dickson seat in the Dewan Rakyat
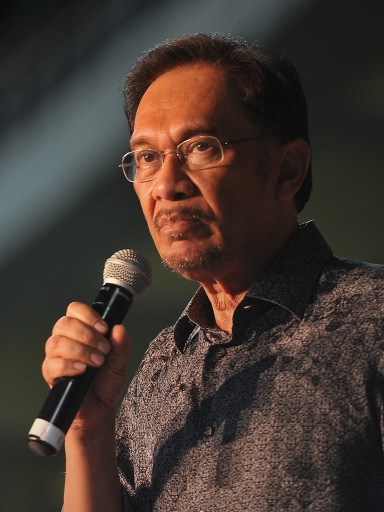
		PAS	IND
Candidate	Anwar Ibrahim	Mohd Nazari Mokhtar	Mohd Isa Abdul Samad
Party	PKR	PAS	Independent
Alliance	PH	GS
Popular vote	31,016	7,456	4,230
Percentage	71.32%	17.14%	9.73%
	IND	IND	IND
Candidate	Stevie Chan Keng Leong	Lau Seck Yan	Kan Chee Yuen
Party	Independent	Independent	Independent
Popular vote	337	214	154
Percentage	0.77%	0.49%	0.35%
	IND
Candidate	Saiful Bukhari Azlan
Party	Independent
Popular vote	82
Percentage	0.19%
- Port Dickson federal constituency border and its corresponding state assembly seats.
MP before election
Danyal Balagopal Abdullah (resigned)
Pakatan Harapan (PKR)
Elected MP
Anwar Ibrahim
Pakatan Harapan (PKR)

A by-election was held on 13 October 2018, for the Dewan Rakyat seat of Port Dickson. The seat became vacant after the resignation of the incumbent member Danyal Balagopal Abdullah, a member of Parti Keadilan Rakyat (PKR) and the governing Pakatan Harapan (PH) coalition. This was the first federal by-election since the 9 May 2018 general election (GE14), which saw the first-ever change of federal government in Malaysia's history.

Danyal Balagopal resigned his seat to pave a way for PKR leader Anwar Ibrahim to return to Parliament, it was dubbed as the 'PD Move'. Anwar was unable to contest the earlier GE14 due to his imprisonment on sodomy charges, which were widely accepted as politically motivated. He received a royal pardon after PH defeated the then-ruling Barisan Nasional (BN) and came into power, restoring his political rights and his eligibility to contest in elections.

The Port Dickson parliamentary constituency had 75,770 registered voters in this by-election. 43% were Malays, 33% Chinese, 22% Indian and 2% other races.

Anwar won the by-election with an increased majority, returning to Parliament for the first time in three years.

== Nomination ==
The nomination day for the by-election was 29 September 2018.

While PH confirmed early that it would field Anwar in the by-election, the oppositions did not announce its candidate until close to the nomination day. The Pan-Malaysian Islamic Party (PAS) was initially expected not to contest the by-election and lend its support to the BN, like they did in the Sungai Kandis and Balakong by-elections.

Criticisms were landed at PH for engineering the by-election too soon after the general election. BN politicians lambasted PH's move as an attempted coronation of Anwar. This was repudiated by prominent PH leaders such as Democratic Action Party (DAP) secretary-general and Finance Minister Lim Guan Eng. Lim said Anwar's return to Parliament was overdue and criticised BN's role in jailing Anwar when they were in government, thus preventing him to contest in the first place.

A candidate from the United Malays National Organization (UMNO) was initially expected to contest for BN. Another BN component party, the Malaysian Indian Congress (MIC), announced that it would not contest the by-election for the coalition. The MIC said that their decision was a protest against UMNO's exclusion of their party from the candidacy consultations. They have previously contested the seat and its predecessor seat Telok Kemang for BN as recently as the 2018 federal elections. Another BN component party, the Malaysian Chinese Association (MCA), also criticised UMNO's sidelining of other BN component parties and its cooperation with PAS.

UMNO itself was divided on what approach it will be taking in the by-election. While most leaders were saying that the party would contest the seat, some prominent leaders were suggesting that the party should not contest and let Anwar win in a walkover. Several UMNO politicians were even planning to support Anwar, therefore bucking their party's official stance. The most notable politician in the last category was former Tourism Minister Nazri Aziz. BN ended up deciding not to contest, as a boycott and protest against the government's forcing of the by-election.

To prevent the absence of opposition candidates, PAS moved to field their own candidate, a retired Lt Col ranked air force officer, Mohd Nazari Mokhtar. Close to the nomination day, the field became more crowded with the surprise entry of two independent candidates, namely Mohd Isa Abdul Samad the former Menteri Besar of Negeri Sembilan and Saiful Bukhari Azlan the former personal aide of Anwar who was also the accuser in his second sodomy trial.

The other independent candidates contested were social media activist Stevie Chan Keng Leong, former lecturer Lau Seck Yan and management consultant Kan Chee Yuen.

An eight and last independent candidate A. Rajendra who had filed his nomination papers, was disqualified because his proposer was not a registered voter in the constituency.

Parti Rakyat Malaysia (PRM) originally stated that they would contest this by-election, but ended up not fielding a candidate. PRM eventually sacked its designated candidate, Ahmad Kamarudin, an ex-PKR member for withdrawing from the by-election claiming insufficient funds for the electoral deposit only at the eleventh hour.

== Controversies ==
A voter in Port Dickson, Rosmadi Mohd Kassim filed a judicial review at the High Court on 27 September 2018, seeking the court to declare that the resignation of incumbent MP Danyal Balagopal Abdullah unconstitutional, thus rendering the move by Election Commission (EC) to hold the by-election as null and void. The High Court dismissed the application on 2 October 2018.

Another Port Dickson voter, Noraziah Mohd Shariff filed on 28 September 2018 for a court declaration to invalidate the royal pardon received by Anwar on the grounds that it was a "full pardon" and not a "free pardon" under the Federal Constitution, which allows a former convict to contest. PAS had hoped that the court would disqualify Anwar after he won and if their candidate finished second, he would instead be declared as the new constituency MP. EC chairman Azhar Azizan Harun affirmed the agency's stand that Anwar was free and eligible to contest and proceed in the by-election. The High Court dismissed the application finally when the applicant and her counsel failed to show up in court on 22 November 2018.

== Campaigning ==
On 8 October 2018, Mahathir Mohamad broke a prime ministerial tradition by coming to Port Dickson to campaign in the by-election. He also spoke on the same stage with Anwar for the first time in twenty years.

Some UMNO members defied their party's official boycott and supported Mohd Isa including his own son. The Indian-based political party Indian Progressive Front (IPF) expressed support for PAS in the by-election. The Negeri Sembilan Parti Gerakan Rakyat Malaysia (GERAKAN) announced their support for Anwar.

== Result ==
Anwar won the Port Dickson by-election with 31,016 votes securing a 23,560-vote majority, with runner-up Mohd Nazari garnering 7,456 votes.

Malaysian general by-election, 2018: Port Dickson Upon the resignation of incumbent, Danyal Balagopal Abdullah
Party	Candidate	Votes	%	∆%
PH	Anwar Ibrahim	31,016	71.32	▲12.26
PAS	Mohd Nazari Mokhtar	7,456	17.14	▲6.39
Independent	Mohd Isa Abdul Samad	4,230	9.73	N/A
Independent	Stevie Chan Keng Leong	337	0.77	N/A
Independent	Lau Seck Yan	214	0.49	N/A
Independent	Kan Chee Yuen	154	0.35	N/A
Independent	Saiful Bukhari Azlan	82	0.19	N/A
Total valid votes		43,489	100.00	
Total rejected ballots		598		
Unreturned ballots		49		
Turnout		44,136	58.25	▼24.91
Registered electors		75,770		
Majority		23,560	54.17	▲25.30
PH hold		Swing		▲2.94
Source(s) "Port Dickson By-election Live Results".

=== Result according to polling districts ===
PH won all polling districts and post and early votes.

== Previous result ==
Malaysian general election, 2018: Port Dickson
Party	Candidate	Votes	%	∆%
PH	Danyal Balagopal Abdullah	36,225	59.06	N/A
BN	Mohan a/l Velayatham	18,515	30.19	N/A
PAS	Mahfuz bin Roslan	6,594	10.75	N/A
Total valid votes		61,334	100.00	
Total rejected ballots		948		
Unreturned ballots		266		
Turnout		62,548	83.16	N/A
Registered electors		75,212		
Majority		17,710	28.87	N/A
PH gain		Swing		{{{3}}}
Source(s) "His Majesty's Government Gazette - Notice of Contested Election, Parliament for the State of Negeri Sembilan [P.U. (B) 242/2018]" (PDF). Attorney General's Chambers of Malaysia. 3 May 2018. "Federal Government Gazette - Results of Contested Election and Statements of the Poll after the Official Addition of Votes, Parliamentary Constituencies for the State of Negeri Sembilan [P.U. (B) 316/2018]" (PDF). Attorney General's Chambers of Malaysia. 28 May 2018.
