= Shamshulkahar Mohd Deli =

Malaysian politician (born 1961)

Yang Berhormat Dato' Shamshulkahar Mohd Deli DPNS PMC PJK MP
- شمس القهّار محمّد دلي

Member of the Negeri Sembilan State Executive Council (Education and Higher Learning Institutions : 14 March 2008–21 May 2013) (Education and Health : 22 May 2013–12 May 2018)
- In office 14 March 2008 – 12 May 2018
- Monarchs: Ja'afar (2008); Muhriz (2008–2018)
- Menteri Besar: Mohamad Hasan
- Preceded by: Mohd Rais Zainuddin
- Succeeded by: Mohamad Rafie Abdul Malek (Education); Veerapan Superamaniam (Health)
- Constituency: Serting

Member of the Malaysian Parliament for Jempol
- Incumbent
- Assumed office 19 November 2022
- Preceded by: Salim Shariff (BN–UMNO)
- Majority: 5,857 (2022)

Member of the Negeri Sembilan State Legislative Assembly for Serting
- In office 8 March 2008 – 12 August 2023
- Preceded by: Lilah Yasin (BN–UMNO)
- Succeeded by: Mohd Fairuz Mohd Isa (PN–PAS)
- Majority: 4,378 (2008); 5,442 (2013); 3,768 (2018)

Faction represented in Dewan Rakyat
- 2022–: Barisan Nasional

Faction represented in Negeri Sembilan State Legislative Assembly
- 2008–2023: Barisan Nasional

Personal details
- Born: Shamsulkahar bin Mohd Deli; 1 August 1961 (age 65) Kuala Pilah, Negeri Sembilan, Federation of Malaya (now Malaysia)
- Citizenship: Malaysian
- Party: United Malays National Organisation (UMNO)
- Other political affiliations: Barisan Nasional (BN)
- Spouse: Rashidah Ismail (died 2022)
- Occupation: Politician

Shamshulkahar bin Mohd Deli (born 1 August 1961) is a Malaysian politician who has served as the Member of Parliament (MP) for Jempol since November 2022. He served as Member of the Negeri Sembilan State Executive Council (EXCO) in the Barisan Nasional (BN) state administration under former Menteri Besar Mohamad Hasan from March 2008 to the collapse of the BN state administration in May 2018 and Member of the Negeri Sembilan State Legislative Assembly (MLA) for Serting from March 2008 to August 2023. He is a member of the United Malays National Organisation (UMNO), a component party of the BN coalition.

== Election results ==
Negeri Sembilan State Legislative Assembly
Year	Constituency	Candidate	Votes	Pct	Opponent(s)	Votes	Pct	Ballots cast	Majority	Turnout
2008	N05 Serting	Shamshulkahar Mohd Deli (UMNO)	7,618	70.16%	Somingon Nasir (PAS)	3,240	29.84%	11,100	4,378	75.58%
2013	N05 Serting	Shamshulkahar Mohd Deli (UMNO)	10,807	66.83%	Abd Rahman Ramli (PAS)	5,365	33.17%	16,424	5,442	85.10%
2018	N05 Serting	Shamshulkahar Mohd Deli (UMNO)	9,782	55.48%	Abd Rahman Ramli (AMANAH)	6,014	34.10%	18,063	3,768	81.60%
2018	N05 Serting	Shamshulkahar Mohd Deli (UMNO)	9,782	55.48%	Muhammad Alzukri Muhammad Yasin (PAS)	1,837	10.42%	18,063	3,768	81.60%

Parliament of Malaysia
Year	Constituency	Candidate	Votes	Pct	Opponent(s)	Votes	Pct	Ballots cast	Majority	Turnout
2022	P127 Jempol	Shamshulkahar Mohd Deli (UMNO)	30,138	41.98%	Norwani Ahmad (AMANAH)	24,281	33.82%	72,808	5,857	75.99%
2022	P127 Jempol	Shamshulkahar Mohd Deli (UMNO)	30,138	41.98%	Norafendy Mohd Salleh (BERSATU)	16,722	23.29%	72,808	5,857	75.99%
2022	P127 Jempol	Shamshulkahar Mohd Deli (UMNO)	30,138	41.98%	Mohd Khalid Mohd Yunus (PEJUANG)	654	0.91%	72,808	5,857	75.99%

== Honours ==
=== Honours of Malaysia ===
- Malaysia
  - Recipient of the 17th Yang di-Pertuan Agong Installation Medal (2024)
- Negeri Sembilan
  - Knight Commander of the Order of Loyalty to Negeri Sembilan (DPNS) – Dato' (2010)
  - Recipient of the Medal for Outstanding Public Service (PMC) (2002)
  - Recipient of the Meritorious Service Medal (PJK) (1988)
