= Mohd Khalid Mohd Yunus =

Malaysian politician

Yang Berbahagia Tan Sri Dato' Mohd Khalid Mohd Yunus PSM DSNS PJK

Deputy Minister of Entrepreneur Development
- In office 2002–2003
- Minister: Mohamed Nazri Abdul Aziz
- Preceded by: Idris Jusoh
- Succeeded by: Khamsiyah Yeop

Deputy Minister of Information
- In office 1999–2002
- Minister: Mohd Khalil Yaakob
- Preceded by: Suleiman Mohamed
- Succeeded by: Zainuddin Maidin

Deputy Minister of Education
- In office 1995–1999
- Minister: Najib Razak
- Preceded by: Fong Chan Onn; Leo Michael Toyad
- Succeeded by: Fong Chan Onn

Deputy Minister of Land and Cooperative Development
- In office 1990–1995
- Minister: Sakaran Dandai; Osu Sukam
- Preceded by: Mohd Kassim @ Yahya Ahmad
- Succeeded by: Goh Cheng Teik

Deputy Minister of Land and Regional Development
- In office 1986–1990
- Minister: Sulaiman Daud; Kasitah Gaddam
- Preceded by: Shariff Ahmad
- Succeeded by: Awang Adek Hussin

Member of the Malaysian Parliament for Jempol, Negeri Sembilan
- In office 1986–2004
- Preceded by: Constituency created
- Succeeded by: Mohd Isa Abdul Samad

Chairman of the Majlis Amanah Rakyat
- In office 1 September 1986 – 31 October 1987
- Preceded by: Tajol Rosli Mohd Ghazali
- Succeeded by: Ismail Said

Member of the Negeri Sembilan Legislative Assembly
- In office 1982–1986
- Menteri Besar: Mohd Isa Abdul Samad

Member of the Negeri Sembilan State Legislative Assembly for Jempol
- In office 1982–1986
- Preceded by: Jaafar Harun
- Succeeded by: Constituency abolished

Personal details
- Born: 26 March 1943 (age 83)
- Party: United Malays National Organisation (UMNO); Parti Bumiputera Perkasa Malaysia (PUTRA) (2018–)
- Other political affiliations: Barisan Nasional (BN); Gerakan Tanah Air (GTA)

Mohd Khalid bin Mohd Yunus (born 26 March 1943) is a Malaysian politician. He had served as Deputy Minister in various departments and different cabinets. He also served as Member of Parliament representing Jempol from 1986 to 2004. He was a member of United Malays National Organisation (UMNO), a component party of Barisan Nasional (BN). He currently is a member of Parti Bumiputera Perkasa Malaysia (PUTRA).

== Political career ==
Mohd Khalid Mohd Yunus initially was a Member of Negeri Sembilan State Legislative Assembly representing Jempol. After the Jempol state constituency seat was abolished, he successfully ran for MP of Jempol in 1986 general elections and Khalid was appointed as Deputy Minister of Land and Regional Development in Mahathir Mohamad third cabinet. Khalid successfully ran for MP of Jempol in 1990, 1995, 1999 respectively, he had served as Deputy Minister of Land and Cooperative Development from 1990 to 1995, Deputy Minister of Education from 1995 to 1999, Deputy Minister of Information from 1999 to 2002 and Deputy Minister of Entrepreneur Development from 2002 to 2003 following cabinet reshuffle.

In 2018, Khalid joined the Parti Bumiputera Perkasa Malaysia (PUTRA) by lifting UMNO. In 2022 general election, he unsuccessfully ran for MP of Jempol.

== Mount Everest Expedition ==
He did not succeed in climbing to the top of Mount Everest, but he reached 7,200 meters. The doctor advised him to stop at that point for health reasons.

== Election results ==
Parliament of Malaysia
| Year | Constituency | Candidate | Votes | Pct | Opponent(s) | Votes | Pct | Ballots cast | Majority | Turnout |
|---|---|---|---|---|---|---|---|---|---|---|
| 1986 | P104 Jempol | Mohd Khalid Mohd Yunus (UMNO) | 17,467 | 66.23% | Tham Kin Sung (DAP) | 7,078 | 26.84% | 26,604 | 10,389 | 74.91% |
| 1986 | P104 Jempol | Mohd Khalid Mohd Yunus (UMNO) | 17,467 | 66.23% | Mohamad Abdullah (PAS) | 1,828 | 6.93% | 26,604 | 10,389 | 74.91% |
| 1990 | P104 Jempol | Mohd Khalid Mohd Yunus (UMNO) | 20,609 | 60.20% | Abdul Aziz Abdullah (S46) | 13,625 | 39.80% | 35,266 | 6,984 | 78.26% |
| 1995 | P114 Jempol | Mohd Khalid Mohd Yunus (UMNO) | 24,653 | 73.37% | Abdul Aziz Abdullah (S46) | 8,949 | 26.63% | 35,251 | 15,704 | 74.80% |
| 1999 | P114 Jempol | Mohd Khalid Mohd Yunus (UMNO) | 23,727 | 66.77% | Abd. Rahim Yusof (PAS) | 11,808 | 33.23% | 36,546 | 11,919 | 73.65% |
| 2022 | P127 Jempol | Mohd Khalid Mohd Yunus (PUTRA) | 654 | 0.91% | Shamshulkahar Mohd Deli (UMNO) | 30,138 | 41.98% | 72,808 | 5,857 | 75.99% |
| 2022 | P127 Jempol | Mohd Khalid Mohd Yunus (PUTRA) | 654 | 0.91% | Norwani Ahmat (AMANAH) | 24,281 | 33.82% | 72,808 | 5,857 | 75.99% |
| 2022 | P127 Jempol | Mohd Khalid Mohd Yunus (PUTRA) | 654 | 0.91% | Norafendy Mohd Salleh (BERSATU) | 16,722 | 23.29% | 72,808 | 5,857 | 75.99% |

== Honours ==
- Malaysia
  - Commander of the Order of Loyalty to the Crown of Malaysia (PSM) – Tan Sri (2016)
- Negeri Sembilan
  - Recipient of the Meritorious Service Medal (PJK) (1980)
  - Knight Companion of the Order of Loyalty to Negeri Sembilan (DSNS) – Dato' (1987)
