= State governments of Malaysia =

Second-level government in Malaysia

The state governments in Malaysia are the governments ruling the 13 states in the federation of Malaysia. All 13 states adopt the Westminster Parliamentary system and each has a unicameral state legislative assembly. Each of the States of Malaya is run by an Executive Council (EXCO), while Sabah and Sarawak have their respective Cabinet and Ministry. The state government structure in all 13 states is similar to the government system of the federal government of Malaysia and that the state legislatures consist of only a single chamber.

== Heads of state ==
For each of the States of Malaya and the Borneo States, the head of state is known as either a ruler or a governor.

The rulers include the sultans of Johor, Pahang, Perak, Kedah, Kelantan, Selangor, and Terengganu; the Raja of Perlis; and the Yang di-Pertuan Besar of Negeri Sembilan.

The governors include the Yang di-Pertua-Yang di-Pertua Negeri of Penang, Malacca, Sabah and Sarawak.

All 13 Heads of State comprise the Conference of Rulers, but only the 9 Rulers from the States of Malaya are eligible to be elected as Yang di-Pertuan Agong, the Supreme Head of the Federation on a rotational basis according to seniority.

The role of the Head of State is similar to the role of the Yang di-Pertuan Agong at the state level, in that the Head of State has the discretion to: appoint a Head of Government who in his opinion is likely to command the confidence of the majority of the State Legislative Assembly; withhold consent to a request for the dissolution of the State Legislative Assembly. However, as Islam is also a state matter, not a federal matter, the Rulers from the States of Malaya also act as the Head of Islam in their respective States and have the discretion to oversee matters relating to Islam or Malay custom, and are able to request for a meeting of the Conference of Rulers in relation to these matters. For the States without Rulers, the Yang di-Pertuan Agong performs the function of the Head of Islam. Otherwise, the Head of State plays a ceremonial role and acts on the advice of the State Government, including assenting to bills passed in the Legislative Assembly by convention.

For the States with Rulers, each Ruler being hereditary monarchs also have the discretion to appoint an heir or heirs, consort, Regent or Council of Regency. For States without Rulers, each governor is appointed by the Yang di-Pertuan Agong acting in his discretion but after consultation with the Head of Government.

== Heads of government ==
For the States with Rulers, the Head of Government is known as the Menteri Besar, in both English and Malay.

For the States without Rulers, the Head of Government is known as the Chief Minister in English, or the Ketua Menteri in Malay. Additionally, for the State of Sarawak, the Head of Government is known as the Premier, in both English and Malay.

== Powers and functions ==
Pursuant to Article 73-79 of the Federal Constitution, the state legislature is empowered to legislate on matters such as land matters, public works, local government, agriculture and forestry, Islamic law and public holidays. Pursuant to Article 80 of the Federal Constitution, the state executive in turn has administrative power over all matters which the state legislature may legislate under the constitution. Federalism in Malaysia is quite strong whereby the federal government retains by far more powers compared to the respective state governments. This is also reflected in the budget allocation towards the state and federal government.

== State government ==
As 10th September 2026

State government	Ruling party	Incumbent
Government of Selangor	Pakatan Harapan and Barisan Nasional	Amirudin Shari (PKR)
Government of Sarawak	Gabungan Parti Sarawak	Abang Abdul Rahman Johari Abang Openg (PBB)
Government of Johor	Barisan Nasional	Onn Hafiz Ghazi (UMNO)
Government of Penang	Pakatan Harapan and Barisan Nasional	Chow Kon Yeow (DAP)
Government of Perak	Barisan Nasional and Pakatan Harapan	Saarani Mohamad (UMNO)
Government of Sabah	Gabungan Rakyat Sabah,Pakatan Harapan, Barisan Nasional, Perikatan Nasional	Hajiji Noor (PGRS)
Government of Pahang	Barisan Nasional and Pakatan Harapan	Wan Rosdy Wan Ismail (UMNO)
Government of Kedah	Perikatan Nasional	Muhammad Sanusi Md Nor (PAS)
Government of Terengganu	Perikatan Nasional	Ahmad Samsuri Mokhtar (PAS)
Government of Negeri Sembilan	Barisan Nasional and Perikatan Nasional	Ismail Lasim (UMNO)
Government of Malacca	Barisan Nasional	Ab Rauf Yusoh (UMNO)
Government of Kelantan	Perikatan Nasional	Mohd Nassuruddin Daud (PAS)
Government of Perlis	Perikatan Nasional	Abu Bakar Hamzah (BERSATU)

== See also ==
- Government of Malaysia
- Local government in Malaysia
- State legislative assemblies of Malaysia
- List of current heads of states and governments of Malaysia
- Heads of state governments of Malaysia
