= Port Dickson (federal constituency) =

Constituency of Negeri Sembilan, Malaysia

Port Dickson (P132)
Negeri Sembilan constituency

Federal constituency
- Legislature: Dewan Rakyat
- MP: Aminuddin Harun; PH
- Constituency created: 1958
- Constituency abolished: 1974
- Constituency re-created: 2018
- First contested: 1959
- Last contested: 2022

Demographics
- Population (2020): 128,954
- Electors (2026): 111,066
- Area (km²): 571
- Pop. density (per km²): 225.8

Port Dickson is a federal constituency in Port Dickson District, Negeri Sembilan and Alor Gajah District (Tanjung Tuan), Malacca, Malaysia that is represented in the Dewan Rakyat from 1959 to 1974 and from 2018 to present. This is only constituency located in two states at same parliamentary seat.

The federal constituency was created in the 1958 redistribution, but it was abolished in the 1974 redistribution. However, in 2018 the Port Dickson federal constituency was re-created and replaced the Telok Kemang federal constituency following the 2018 redelineation and is mandated to return a single member to the Dewan Rakyat under the first past the post voting system.

== Demographics ==
Ethnic breakdown of Port Dickson's electorate as of 2022
1. Malay (44.2%)
2. Chinese (31.4%)
3. Indian (21.1%)
4. Other ethnicities (3.30%)

As of 2020, Port Dickson has a population of 128,954 people.

Age breakdown of Port Dickson's electorate as of 2022
1. 18-20 (6.60%)
2. 21-29 (21.4%)
3. 30-39 (22.4%)
4. 40-49 (17.1%)
5. 50-59 (14.1%)
6. 60-69 (10.9%)
7. 70-79 (5.35%)
8. 80-89 (1.75%)
9. above 90 (0.38%)
Gender breakdown of Port Dickson's electorate as of 2022
1. Male (51.1%)
2. Female (48.9%)

== History ==
=== Polling districts ===
According to the gazette issued on 23 July 2026, the Port Dickson constituency has a total of 32 polling districts.

State constituency	Polling districts	Code	Location
Chuah（N29）	Tanah Merah	132/29/01	SJK (T) Ladang Tanah Merah; SJK (C) Kampung Baru Tanah Merah Site A; SMK Tanah Merah
Chuah（N29）	Kampung Pachitan	132/29/02	SK Kg Sawah
Chuah（N29）	Bukit Pelandok	132/29/03	SJK (C) Yik Chiao
Chuah（N29）	Sungai Nipah	132/29/04	SJK (C) Kg Baru Sg Nipah
Chuah（N29）	Chuah	132/29/05	SMA Chuah
Lukut (N30）	Kampung Jimah Baru	132/30/01	SK Jimah Baru
Lukut (N30）	Bandar Spring Hill	132/30/02	SA Rakyat An Nur Bandar Spring Hill; SJK (T) Bandar Springhill
Lukut (N30）	Taman Indah Jaya	132/30/03	SK Lukut
Lukut (N30）	Kuala Lukut	132/30/04	SMK Raja Jumaat
Lukut (N30）	Lukut	132/30/05	SJK (T) Ladang Sungai Salak
Lukut (N30）	Sri Parit	132/30/06	SJK (C) Chung Hua Lukut
Lukut (N30）	Tanjong Gemok	132/30/07	SJK (C) Bradwall
Bagan Pinang（N31）	Ladang Atherton	132/31/01	SJK (T) Ladang Atherton
Bagan Pinang（N31）	Pekan Siliau	132/31/02	SJK (T) Ldg Siliau
Bagan Pinang（N31）	Ladang Bradwall	132/31/03	SJK (T) Ldg Bradwall
Bagan Pinang（N31）	Sua Betong	132/31/04	SJK (T) Ldg Sua Betong
Bagan Pinang（N31）	Sunggala	132/31/05	SK Si-Rusa
Bagan Pinang（N31）	Kampung Bagan Pinang	132/31/06	SK Panglima Adnan
Bagan Pinang（N31）	Si Rusa	132/31/07	SK Kampung Baru Sirusa
Bagan Pinang（N31）	Telok Kemang	132/31/08	SK Telok Kemang; SK Intan Perdana
Linggi（N32）	Ayer Kuning	132/32/01	Balai Raya Kampung Barisan
Linggi（N32）	Linggi	132/32/02	SK Linggi
Linggi（N32）	Kampung Pengkalan Durian	132/32/03	Pusat Pemulihan Dalam Komuniti Cahaya Ikhsan Linggi
Linggi（N32）	Pengkalan Kempas	132/32/04	SK Permatang Pasir
Linggi（N32）	Ladang Sengkang	132/32/05	SJK (T) Ladang Sengkang
Linggi（N32）	Kampong Sungai Raya	132/32/06	SK Tanjong Agas
Linggi（N32）	Pasir Panjang	132/32/07	SJK (C) Chung Hua Pasir Panjang; Balai Raya Kampung Orang Asli Palebar Baru
Linggi（N32）	Bandar Baru Sunggala	132/32/08	SMA Telok Kemang; SMK Intan Perdana
Sri Tanjong（N33）	Kampung Paya	132/33/01	KV Port Dickson; SRA Taman Desa Permai
Sri Tanjong（N33）	Kampung Arab	132/33/02	SK Kampong Gelam
Sri Tanjong（N33）	Kampung Chokra	132/33/03	SJK (T) Port Dickson
Sri Tanjong（N33）	Pekan Port Dickson	132/33/04	SK Port Dickson; SMK Datuk Haji Abdul Samad

=== Representation history ===
Members of Parliament for Port Dickson
Parliament	No	Years	Member	Party	Vote Share
Constituency created from Negri Sembilan Selatan
Parliament of the Federation of Malaya
1st	P082	1959–1963	T. Mahima Singh (ਮਹਿਮਾ ਸਿੰਘ ਥਾਲੀਵਾਲ)	Alliance (MIC)	Uncontested
Parliament of Malaysia
1st	P082	1963–1964	T. Mahima Singh (ਮਹਿਮਾ ਸਿੰਘ ਥਾਲੀਵਾਲ)	Alliance (MIC)	Uncontested
2nd	P082	1964–1969	T. Mahima Singh (ਮਹਿਮਾ ਸਿੰਘ ਥਾਲੀਵਾਲ)	Alliance (MIC)	7,911; 49.35%
		1969–1971	Parliament was suspended		
3rd	P082	1971–1974	Soorian Arjunan (சூரியன் அர்ஜுனன்)	DAP	10,266; 53.89%
Constituency abolished, renamed to Telok Kemang
Constituency re-created, renamed from Telok Kemang
14th	P132	2018	Danyal Balagopal Abdullah (டான்யல் பலகோபால் அப்துல்லா)	PH (PKR)	26,225; 59.06%
14th	P132	2018–2022	Anwar Ibrahim (انوار ابراهيم)	PH (PKR)	31,016; 71.32%
15th	P132	2022–present	Aminuddin Harun (أمين الدين هارون)	PH (PKR)	42,013; 52.40%

=== State constituency ===
Parliamentary constituency	State constituency						
Parliamentary constituency	1955–59*	1959–1974	1974–1986	1986–1995	1995–2004	2004–2018	2018–present
Port Dickson							Bagan Pinang
Port Dickson							Chuah
Port Dickson		Jimah					
Port Dickson		Linggi					Linggi
Port Dickson		Lukut					Lukut
Port Dickson		Pasir Panjang					
Port Dickson		Si Rusa					
Port Dickson							Sri Tanjung

=== Historical boundaries ===
State Constiteuncy	Area	
State Constiteuncy	1959	2018
Bagan Pinang		Bagan Pinang; Ladang Salak; Silau; Si Rusa; Telok Kemang
Chuah		Bukit Pelandok; Chuah; Sungai Nipah; Taman Merpati; Tanah Merah
Jimah	Bukit Pelandok; Chuah; Jimah; Taman Merpati; Tanah Merah	
Linggi	Ladang Sua Betong; Ladang Tampin Linggi; Linggi; Kampung Kundur Tengah; Kampung Pengkalan Durian	Ayer Kuning; Linggi; Pasir Panjang; Pengkalan Kempas; Teluk Pelanduk
Lukut	Kampung Baru Sri Parit; Kampung Paya; Ladang Salak; Lukut; Silau	Bandar Dataran Segar; Bandar Springhill; Lukut; Taman Tun Sambathan; Taman Vista Jaya
Pasir Panjang	Kampung Bukit Tembok; Kampung Tanjung Agas; Lubok China; Pasir Panjang; Pengkalan Kempas	
Si Rusa	Bagan Pinang; Kampung Gelam; Port Dickson; Telok Kemang; Telok Pelanduk	
Sri Tanjung		Kampung Gelam; Kampung Paya; Port Dickson; Taman Intan Duyong; Taman Toh Kee Kah

=== Current state assembly members ===
No.	State Constituency	Member	Coalition (Party)
N29	Chuah	Yew Boon Lye	PH (PKR)
N30	Lukut	Choo Ken Hwa	PH (DAP)
N31	Bagan Pinang	Abdul Fatah Zakaria	PN (PAS)
N32	Linggi	Mohd Faizal Ramli	BN (UMNO)
N33	Sri Tanjung	Rajasekaran Gunasekaran	PH (PKR)

=== Local governments & postcodes ===
No.	State Constituency	Local Government	Postcode
N29	Chuah	Port Dickson Municipal Council	71000, 71010, 71050, 71960 Port Dickson; 71100 Rantau; 71150 Linggi; 71250 Si Rusa; 71900 Labu
N30	Lukut	Port Dickson Municipal Council	71000, 71010, 71050, 71960 Port Dickson; 71100 Rantau; 71150 Linggi; 71250 Si Rusa; 71900 Labu
N31	Bagan Pinang	Port Dickson Municipal Council	71000, 71010, 71050, 71960 Port Dickson; 71100 Rantau; 71150 Linggi; 71250 Si Rusa; 71900 Labu
N32	Linggi	Port Dickson Municipal Council; Alor Gajah Municipal Council (Tanjung Tuan area)	71000, 71010, 71050, 71960 Port Dickson; 71100 Rantau; 71150 Linggi; 71250 Si Rusa; 71900 Labu
N33	Sri Tanjung	Port Dickson Municipal Council	71000, 71010, 71050, 71960 Port Dickson; 71100 Rantau; 71150 Linggi; 71250 Si Rusa; 71900 Labu

== Election results ==
Malaysian general election, 2022
Party	Candidate	Votes	%	∆%
PH	Aminuddin Harun	42,013	52.40	▼18.92
BN	P. Kamalanathan	18,412	22.96	▼7.23
PN	Rafei Mustapha	18,235	22.74	▲22.74
PEJUANG	Ahmad Idham Ahmad Nazri	1,084	1.35	▲1.35
Independent	Abdul Rani Kulup Abdullah	441	0.55	▲0.55
Total valid votes		80,185	100.00	
Total rejected ballots		1,089		
Unreturned ballots		162		
Turnout		81,436	78.00	▲19.40
Registered electors		104,450		
Majority		23,601	29.44	▼24.74
PH hold		Swing		
Source(s) https://lom.agc.gov.my/ilims/upload/portal/akta/outputp/1753263/PUB615%20PARLIMEN%20NEGERI%20SEMBILAN.pdf

Malaysian general by-election, 13 October 2018 Upon the resignation of incumbent, Danyal Balagopal Abdullah
Party	Candidate	Votes	%	∆%
PH	Anwar Ibrahim	31,016	71.32	▲71.32
PAS	Mohd Nazari Mokhtar	7,456	17.14	▲6.39
Independent	Mohd Isa Abdul Samad	4,230	9.73	▲9.73
Independent	Stevie Chan Keng Leong	337	0.77	▲0.77
Independent	Lau Seck Yan	214	0.49	▲0.49
Independent	Kan Chee Yuen	154	0.35	▲0.35
Independent	Saiful Bukhari Azlan	82	0.19	▲0.19
Total valid votes		43,489		
Total rejected ballots		598		
Unreturned ballots		49		
Turnout		44,136	58.60	▲29.73
Registered electors		75,317		
Majority		23,560	54.18	▲25.31
PH hold		Swing		

Malaysian general election, 2018
Party	Candidate	Votes	%	∆%
PKR	Danyal Balagopal Abdullah	36,225	59.06	
BN	Mohan Velayatham	18,515	30.19	
PAS	Mahfuz Roslan	6,594	10.75	
Total valid votes		61334	100.00	
Total rejected ballots		948		
Unreturned ballots		266		
Turnout		62,548	83.16	
Registered electors		75,212		
Majority		17,710	28.87	
PKR hold		Swing		
Source(s) "His Majesty's Government Gazette - Notice of Contested Election, Parliament for the State of Negeri Sembilan [P.U. (B) 242/2018]" (PDF). Attorney General's Chambers of Malaysia. 3 May 2018. "Federal Government Gazette - Results of Contested Election and Statements of the Poll after the Official Addition of Votes, Parliamentary Constituencies for the State of Negeri Sembilan [P.U. (B) 316/2018]" (PDF). Attorney General's Chambers of Malaysia. 28 May 2018.

Malaysian general election, 1969
Party	Candidate	Votes	%	∆%
DAP	Soorian Arjunan	10,266	53.89	▲53.89
Alliance	Mahima Singh Thaliwal Karam Singh	6,606	34.68	▼14.69
PMIP	Mansor Abu Bakar	1,872	9.83	▲9.83
United Malaysian Chinese Organisation	Wong Tai Oon	307	1.61	▲1.61
Total valid votes		19,051	100.00	
Total rejected ballots		697		
Unreturned ballots		0		
Turnout		19,748	74.18	▼6.64
Registered electors		26,623		
Majority		3,660	19.21	▼16.58
DAP gain from Alliance		Swing		?

Malaysian general election, 1964
Party	Candidate	Votes	%	∆%
Alliance	Mahima Singh Thaliwal Karam Singh	7,911	49.35	▲49.35
UDP	Ng Hup Chwee	2,174	13.56	▲13.56
Independent	Nadchatiram Saraswathy Devi	2,074	12.94	▲12.94
Socialist Front	R. Murugan	2,020	12.60	▲12.60
PPP	Ibrahim Ahmad	1,349	8.41	▲8.41
Independent	Ong Boon Hong	504	3.14	▲3.14
Total valid votes		16,032	100.00	
Total rejected ballots		1,219		
Unreturned ballots		0		
Turnout		17,251	78.12	
Registered electors		22,083		
Majority		5,737	35.79	
Alliance hold		Swing		

Malayan general election, 1959
Party	Candidate	Votes	%
On the nomination day, Mahima Singh Thaliwal Karam Singh won uncontested.
Alliance	Mahima Singh Thaliwal Karam Singh		
Total valid votes			100.00
Total rejected ballots			
Unreturned ballots			
Turnout			
Registered electors		15,763	
Majority			
This was a new constituency created.
