= Danyal Balagopal Abdullah =

Malaysian politician

Yang Berbahagia Dato' Pahlawan Danyal Balagopal Abdullah DPTS JSM

Member of the Malaysian Parliament for Port Dickson
- In office 9 May 2018 – 12 September 2018
- Preceded by: Kamarul Baharin Abbas (PR–PKR) (as MP for Telok Kemang)
- Succeeded by: Anwar Ibrahim (PH–PKR)
- Majority: 17,710 (2018)

Personal details
- Born: 1950 (age 75–76) Batu Kurau, Perak

Military service
- Allegiance: Malaysia
- Branch/service: Royal Malaysian Navy
- Rank: Laksamana pertama

Danyal Balagopal bin Abdullah (b.1950) is a Malaysian politician who served as Member of Parliament (MP) for Port Dickson from May 2018 to September 2018.

On 12 September 2018, Danyal Balagopal Abdullah resigned as MP for Port Dickson, in order to pave away for former Deputy Prime Minister Anwar Ibrahim return to Parliament, however his decision caught under fire, accused him betray the Voters in Port Dickson, He defended his decision for resignation.

== Election results ==
Parliament of Malaysia
Year	Constituency	Candidate	Votes	Pct	Opponent(s)	Votes	Pct	Ballots cast	Majority	Turnout
2018	P132 Port Dickson	Danyal Balagopal Abdullah (PKR)	36,225	59.06%	Mohan Velayatham (MIC)	18,515	30.19%	62,548	17,710	83.16%
2018	P132 Port Dickson	Danyal Balagopal Abdullah (PKR)	36,225	59.06%	Mahfuz Roslan (PAS)	6,594	10.75%	62,548	17,710	83.16%

== Honours ==
- Malaysia :
  - Companion of the Order of Loyalty to the Crown of Malaysia (JSM) (2003)
- Perak :
  - Knight Commander of the Order of Taming Sari (DPTS) – Dato' Pahlawan (2004)
