= Repah =

Political subdivision in Malaysia

Repah (N36)
Negeri Sembilan constituency

State constituency
- Legislature: Negeri Sembilan State Legislative Assembly
MLA
Koh Kim Swee
BN
- Constituency created: 1984
- First contested: 1986
- Last contested: 2026

Demographics
- Electors (2023): 27,284

N36 Repah within Negeri Sembilan, as used for the 2023 and 2026 state elections

Repah is a state constituency in Negeri Sembilan, Malaysia, that has been represented in the Negeri Sembilan State Legislative Assembly.

The state constituency was first contested in 1986 and is mandated to return a single Assemblyman to the Negeri Sembilan State Legislative Assembly under the first-past-the-post voting system.

== Demographics ==
Ethnic breakdown of Repah's electorate as of 2026
1. Chinese (41.0%)
2. Malay (40.1%)
3. Indian (17.4%)
4. Other ethnicities (1.40%)

== History ==
=== Polling districts ===
According to the gazette issued on 23 July 2026, the Repah constituency has a total of 8 polling districts.

State constituency	Polling districts	Code	Location
Repah (N36)	Repah	133/36/01	SMA Repah; SJK (T) Ladang Repah
Repah (N36)	Kampong Bahru Tampin	133/36/02	SJK (C) Kg Baru Tampin
Repah (N36)	Pekan Tampin	133/36/03	SJK (T) Tampin
Repah (N36)	Kampong Batu Belang	133/36/04	SMK Taman Indah; SK Dr Sulaiman
Repah (N36)	Keru	133/36/05	SK Keru
Repah (N36)	Tebong	136/36/06	SK Tunku Syed Syaaban
Repah (N36)	Kampong Asahan	136/36/07	Maahad Ahmadi Gemencheh
Repah (N36)	Taman Indah	133/36/08	SK Tengku Zainun; SK Tungku Besar Tampin

=== Representation history ===
Member of the Legislative for Repah
Assembly	No	Years	Name	Party
Constituency created from Gemencheh
7th	N11	1986-1990	Lay Chun Tai @ Loy Chee Tai (黎志泰)	BN (MCA)
8th	N11	1990-1995	Lay Chun Tai @ Loy Chee Tai (黎志泰)	BN (MCA)
9th	N11	1995-1997	Lay Chun Tai @ Loy Chee Tai (黎志泰)	BN (MCA)
9th	N11	1997-1999	Gan Chin Yap (颜振叶)	BN (MCA)
10th	N11	1999-2004	Gan Chin Yap (颜振叶)	BN (MCA)
11th	N36	2004-2008	Gan Chin Yap (颜振叶)	BN (MCA)
12th	N36	2008-2013	Veerapan Superamaniam	PR (DAP)
13th	N36	2013-2018	Veerapan Superamaniam	PR (DAP)
14th	N36	2018-2023	Veerapan Superamaniam	PH (DAP)
15th	N36	2023–2026	Veerapan Superamaniam	PH (DAP)
16th	N36	2026–present	Koh Kim Swee (许金水)	BN (MCA)

== Election results ==
Negeri Sembilan state election, 2026: Repah
Party	Candidate	Votes	%	∆%
BN	Koh Kim Swee	9,779	51.16	▲51.16
PH	Veerapan Superamaniam	9,335	48.84	▼18.59
Total valid votes		19,114	100.00	
Total rejected ballots		182		
Unreturned ballots		17		
Turnout		19,313	69.20	▲7.47
Registered electors		27,910		
Majority		444	2.32	▼32.54
BN gain from PH		Swing		?

Negeri Sembilan state election, 2023: Repah
Party	Candidate	Votes	%	∆%
PH	Veerapan Superamaniam	11,507	67.43	▲67.43
PN	Yong Li Yi	5,557	32.57	▲32.57
Total valid votes		17,064	100.00	
Total rejected ballots		193		
Unreturned ballots		20		
Turnout		17,277	63.32	▼20.67
Registered electors		27,284		
Majority		5,950	34.86	▲5.74
PH hold		Swing		

Negeri Sembilan state election, 2018: Repah
Party	Candidate	Votes	%	∆%
PKR	Veerapan Superamaniam	9,568	58.57	▲58.57
BN	Koh Kim Swee	4,810	29.45	▼10.15
PAS	Abdul Razakek Abdul Rahim	1,957	11.98	▲11.98
Total valid votes		16,335	100.00	
Total rejected ballots		189		
Unreturned ballots		56		
Turnout		16,580	83.98	▼1.68
Registered electors		19,742		
Majority		4,758	29.12	▲16.99
PKR hold		Swing		

Negeri Sembilan state election, 2013: Repah
Party	Candidate	Votes	%	∆%
DAP	Veerapan Superamaniam	8,293	51.73	▼0.70
BN	Yap Seong Fook	6,349	39.60	▼7.97
Independent	Fadzil A. Bakar	1,390	8.67	▲8.67
Total valid votes		16,032	100.00	
Total rejected ballots		291		
Unreturned ballots		44		
Turnout		16,367	85.66	▲10.80
Registered electors		19,107		
Majority		1,944	12.13	▲7.27
DAP hold		Swing		

Negeri Sembilan state election, 2008: Repah
Party	Candidate	Votes	%	∆%
DAP	Veerapan Superamaniam	5,977	52.43	▲16.36
BN	Yap Seong Fook	5,424	47.57	▼16.36
Total valid votes		11,401	100.00	
Total rejected ballots		441		
Unreturned ballots		0		
Turnout		11,842	74.86	▲0.87
Registered electors		15,819		
Majority		553	4.85	▼23.02
DAP gain from BN		Swing		?

Negeri Sembilan state election, 2004: Repah
Party	Candidate	Votes	%	∆%
BN	Gan Chin Yap	6,538	63.94	▲8.88
DAP	Kok Chan Wah	3,688	36.06	▼8.88
Total valid votes		10,226	100.00	
Total rejected ballots		388		
Unreturned ballots		0		
Turnout		10,614	73.99	▼0.46
Registered electors		14,345		
Majority		2,850	27.87	▲17.77
BN hold		Swing		

Negeri Sembilan state election, 1999: Repah
Party	Candidate	Votes	%	∆%
BN	Gan Chin Yap	5,301	55.05	▼12.05
DAP	Kok Chan Wah	4,328	44.95	▲12.05
Total valid votes		9,629	100.00	
Total rejected ballots		276		
Unreturned ballots		55		
Turnout		9,960	74.45	▲13.70
Registered electors		13,378		
Majority		973	10.10	▼24.09
BN hold		Swing		

Negeri Sembilan state by-election, 29 May 1997: Repah Upon the death of the incumbent, Lay Chun Tai
Party	Candidate	Votes	%	∆%
BN	Gan Chin Yap	4,550	67.10	▲6.89
DAP	Wong Zee Nyok	2,231	32.90	▲7.93
Total valid votes		6,781	100.00	
Total rejected ballots		147		
Unreturned ballots		102		
Turnout		7,030	60.76	▼12.47
Registered electors		11,571		
Majority		2,319	34.20	▼1.04
BN hold		Swing		

Negeri Sembilan state election, 1995: Repah
Party	Candidate	Votes	%	∆%
BN	Lay Chun Tai	4,769	60.21	▼1.25
DAP	Lai Kui	1,978	24.97	▼8.33
Independent	S. Omar S. Abdullah	865	10.92	▲5.68
PAS	Aminuddin Abdullah	309	3.90	▲3.90
Total valid votes		7,921	100.00	
Total rejected ballots		250		
Unreturned ballots		131		
Turnout		8,302	73.22	▼1.63
Registered electors		11,338		
Majority		2,791	35.24	▲7.09
BN hold		Swing		

Negeri Sembilan state election, 1990: Repah
Party	Candidate	Votes	%	∆%
BN	Lay Chun Tai	4,410	61.45	▲9.36
DAP	Abd. Malek Aman	2,390	33.31	▲18.03
Independent	Mokhtar Sariat	376	5.24	▼27.39
Total valid votes		7,176	100.00	
Total rejected ballots		222		
Unreturned ballots		24		
Turnout		7,422	74.86	▲1.32
Registered electors		9,915		
Majority		2,020	28.15	▲8.68
BN hold		Swing		

Negeri Sembilan state election, 1986: Repah
Party	Candidate	Votes	%
BN	Lay Chun Tai	3,315	52.10
Independent	Woo Ah Lek	2,076	32.63
DAP	Lee Kong Chon	972	15.28
Total valid votes		6,363	100.00
Total rejected ballots		257	
Unreturned ballots		0	
Turnout		6,620	73.54
Registered electors		9,002	
Majority		1,239	19.47
This was a new constituency created.
