= Veerapan Superamaniam =

Malaysian politician

- வீரப்பன் சுப்பிரமணியம்
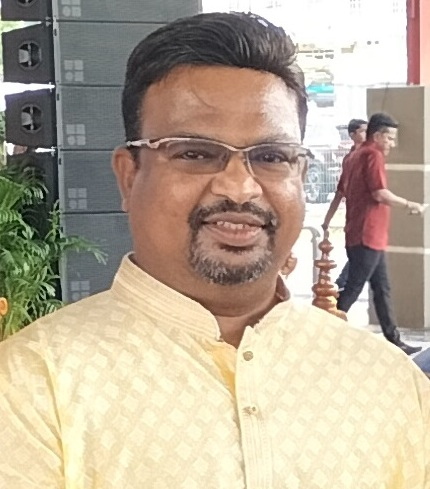
- Veerapan Superamanian in 2024

Member of the Negeri Sembilan State Executive Council
- In office 24 August 2023 – 2 August 2026
- Monarch: Muhriz
- Menteri Besar: Aminuddin Harun
- Portfolio: Entrepreneurship, Human Resources, Climate Change, Cooperatives & Consumerism
- Preceded by: Mohamad Rafie Abdul Malek (Entrepreneurship); Chew Seh Yong (Human Resources); Himself (Cooperatives and Consumerism); Portfolio established (Climate Change)
- Constituency: Repah
- In office 23 May 2018 – 14 August 2023
- Monarch: Muhriz
- Menteri Besar: Aminuddin Harun
- Portfolio: Health, Environment, Cooperatives and Consumerism
- Preceded by: Shamshulkahar Mohd Deli (Health); Abu Ubaidah Redza (Environment, Cooperatives and Consumerism)
- Succeeded by: Tengku Zamrah Tengku Sulaiman (Health); Himself (Cooperatives and Consumerism); Portfolio abolished (Environment)
- Constituency: Repah

Member of the Negeri Sembilan State Legislative Assembly for Repah
- In office 8 March 2008 – 1 August 2026
- Preceded by: Gan Chin Yap (BN–MCA)
- Succeeded by: Koh Kim Swee (BN–MCA)
- Majority: 553 (2008); 1,944 (2013); 4,758 (2018); 5,950 (2023)

Faction represented in the Negeri Sembilan State Legislative Assembly
- 2008–2018: Democratic Action Party
- 2018–: Pakatan Harapan

Personal details
- Born: Veerapan a/l Superamaniam; 30 March 1975 (age 51) Negeri Sembilan, Malaysia
- Party: Democratic Action Party (DAP)
- Other political affiliations: Pakatan Rakyat (PR) (2008–2015); Pakatan Harapan (PH) (since 2015)
- Spouse: Tee Yen Fang
- Children: 2
- Education: University of London (LLB); University of Malaya (CLP)
- Occupation: Politician
- Profession: Lawyer

Veerapan a/l Superamaniam (born 30 March 1975) is a Malaysian politician who served as Member of the Negeri Sembilan State Executive Council (EXCO) in the Pakatan Harapan (PH) state administration under former Menteri Besar Aminuddin Harun from May 2018 to August 2026 as well as Member of the Negeri Sembilan State Legislative Assembly (MLA) for Repah from March 2008 to August 2026. He is a member of the Democratic Action Party (DAP), a component party of the PH and formerly Pakatan Rakyat (PR) coalitions.

== Election results ==
Negeri Sembilan State Legislative Assembly
Year	Constituency	Candidate	Votes	Pct	Opponent(s)	Votes	Pct	Ballots cast	Majority	Turnout%
2008	N36 Repah	Veerapan Superamaniam (DAP)	5,977	52.43%	Yap Seong Fook (MCA)	5,424	47.57%	11,842	553	74.86%
2013	N36 Repah	Veerapan Superamaniam (DAP)	8,293	51.73%	Yap Seong Fook (MCA)	6,349	39.60%	16,323	1,944	85.70%
2013	N36 Repah	Veerapan Superamaniam (DAP)	8,293	51.73%	Fadzil A Bakar (IND)	1,390	8.67%	16,323	1,944	85.70%
2018	N36 Repah	Veerapan Superamaniam (DAP)	9,568	58.57%	Koh Kim Swee (MCA)	4,810	29.45%	16,580	4,758	84.00%
2018	N36 Repah	Veerapan Superamaniam (DAP)	9,568	58.57%	Abdul Razakek Abdul Rahim (PAS)	1,957	11.98%	16,580	4,758	84.00%
2023	N36 Repah	Veerapan Superamaniam (DAP)	11,507	67.43%	Yong Li Yi (GERAKAN)	5,557	32.57%	17,257	5,950	63.25%
2026	N36 Repah	Veerapan Superamaniam (DAP)	9,335	48.84%	Koh Kim Swee (MCA)	9,779	51.16%	19,313	444	69.20%
