= Saiful Bukhari Azlan =

Malaysian politician

- Born: Mohamad Saiful Bukhari bin Azlan; 6 July 1985 (age 41); Johor Bahru, Johor, Malaysia
- Education: Electrical engineering
- Alma mater: Universiti Tenaga Nasional (UNITEN) (dismissed)
- Occupation: Politician
- Known for: Claimed to be Anwar's second sodomy trial victim
- Political party: People's Justice Party (PKR); Malaysian United Indigenous Party (BERSATU) (2021–2022)
- Other political affiliations: Perikatan Nasional (PN) (2021–2022)
- Spouse: Nik Suryani Megat Deraman (m. 2013)
- Children: 2
- Parent(s): Azlan Mohd Lazim; Halina Mohd Alip
- Website: mohdsaifulbukhari.blogspot.com

Mohd Saiful Bukhari Azlan (born 6 July 1985) is a Malaysian businessman and politician. He joined the Malaysian United Indigenous Party (BERSATU) in 2021. In 2022, he quit BERSATU.

He was the personal assistant of former Malaysia Opposition Leader Anwar Ibrahim and also the accuser in Anwar's second sodomy trial. On 28 June 2008, he lodged a police report claiming that he had been forcibly sodomised by Anwar. When it was put to him that a 61-year-old man is unlikely to be able to physically overpower a 24-year-old man, he changed his complaint to "homosexual conduct by persuasion". Sodomy, even if consensual, is punishable by up to 20 years' imprisonment and whipping under Section 377B of the Malaysian Penal Code.

== Early life and education ==
Saiful was born on 6 July 1985 in Johor Bahru, Johor, Malaysia to the couple of Azlan Mohd Lazim and Halina Mohd Alip.

From 2006 to 2007, Saiful attended the Universiti Tenaga Nasional (UNITEN) in Bangi, Selangor where he was a pro-student activist and a candidate for the university's student body president.

Saiful was an electrical engineering student but did not earn a degree due to his dismissal from the college in 2007. In the 2008 Malaysian general election, he supported the opposition political party, accusing the incumbent Prime Minister, Abdullah Ahmad Badawi, of cronyism and corruption.

== Early career ==
After being dismissed from UNITEN, Saiful became a volunteer worker at the Petaling Jaya branch office of the People's Justice Party (PKR). He was later appointed as a personal assistant to party leader, Anwar Ibrahim. One of his duties as personal assistant was to organize meetings with parliamentary members wanting to switch over to the People's Justice Party. The meetings were held in a privately owned condominium in Desa Damansara (Damansara Heights), Kuala Lumpur, Malaysia. He accompanied Anwar on several of his overseas trips during this period including travel to Hong Kong (early May 2008), Bangkok (late May 2008) and Singapore (16 June and 18 June 2008), according to his passport. Saiful was also used to assist Anwar's chief of staff in creating and arranging Anwar's schedule.

Saiful is an avid blogger and his blog has popular followings among pro-opposition as well as pro-government groups. In his blog, he once accused Anwar of trying to persuade members of parliament to jump parties.

== Political career ==
Saiful contested as an independent candidate in the Port Dickson by-election held on 13 October 2018 after the seat was vacated by its incumbent member of parliament Danyal Balagopal Abdullah to enable Anwar to contest and be elected back to the parliament. Saiful only managed to get 82 votes and lost his electoral deposit in the seven-cornered by-election which was won by Anwar with a majority of 23,560 votes on 13 October 2018.

In 2021, he joined the BERSATU as his first political platform after involving himself in the political arena without any political party officially.

== Legal issues ==
=== Court case ===
On 7 August 2008, Anwar was charged in the Kuala Lumpur Session Court for sodomy without consent, the victim being Saiful. Saiful has alleged that he was sodomised by Anwar on numerous occasions. The last offence was committed on 26 June 2008, at 11-5-1 Desa Damansara Condominium, No 99, Jalan Setiakasih, Bukit Damansara, Kuala Lumpur, Malaysia.

Anwar was charged under Section 377B Kanun Keseksaan of the Malaysian penal code, that can amount to 20 years incarceration and whipping if found guilty. He pleaded not guilty to the allegations.

- Section 377A penal code defines the term "sodomise" as: "Any person who has sexual connection with another person by the introduction of the penis into the anus or mouth of the other person is said to commit carnal intercourse against the order of nature."
- Section 377B penal code states: "Whoever voluntarily commits carnal intercourse against the order of nature shall be punished with imprisonment for a term which may extend to twenty years, and shall also be liable to whipping."
- Section 377C penal code states: "Whoever voluntarily commits carnal intercourse against the order of nature on another person without the consent, or against the will, of the other person, or by putting the other person in fear of death or injury to the person or any other person, shall be punished with imprisonment for a term of not less than five years and not more than twenty years, and shall also be liable to whipping."

=== Religious oath-taking ===
On 15 August 2008, in the main hall of the Federal Territory Mosque, Jalan Duta, Kuala Lumpur, Saiful took an oath pursuant to the Shariah Islamic principles that he spoke the truth. The ceremony lasted 15 minutes and was witnessed by more than 30 people, including photographers and camera operators. No mainstream or government media were permitted to record the event. Before taking the oath, Saiful read a couple of verses from the Quran including the Surah Al-Fatihah.

Saiful's oath:

I, Saiful Bukhari Azlan, swear by the Name of Allah, the Most Gracious the Most Merciful, that I was sodomized by Datuk Seri Anwar Ibrahim on 26th June 2008. On that day Datuk Seri Anwar Ibrahim put his genital inside my anus.

If I lied in this confession, then I'm lying to God and I will accept the consequences, I will be damned until the day of judgement, only God knows everything.

Among those who witnessed the oath taking ceremony were Saiful's father Azlan Mohd Lazim and the mosque designated Imam Ramlang Porigi. A press conference was then held at the Dinasti Hotel, Kuala Lumpur.

=== Reactions of other political and religious leaders ===
Perlis's mufti, Mohd Asri Zainul Abidin said that the oath taken by Saiful was in accordance with Islam. This is because he has declared with intent and proclaiming the divine words of Wallahi, Wabillahi, Watallahi.

United Malays National Organisation (UMNO) Deputy Youth Chief Khairy Jamaluddin then said that Saiful's oath cannot be undermined as those who have taken the divine oath invoke Allah's wrath if they are lying.

== Personal life ==
On 20 October 2012, Saiful became engaged to former TV3 personality Nik Suriani Megat Deraman and subsequently married her on 25 May 2013. The couple was found doing a batik and songket business at a booth during UMNO General Assembly 2016 at Putra World Trade Centre (PWTC). Other than their fashion business, the couple also has a political and media consultancy firm.

== Election results ==
Parliament of Malaysia
Year	Constituency	Candidate	Votes	Pct	Opponent(s)	Votes	Pct	Ballots cast	Majority	Turnout
2018	P132 Port Dickson	Saiful Bukhari Azlan (IND)	82	0.19%	Anwar Ibrahim (PKR)	31,016	71.32%	43,489	23,560	58.25%
2018	P132 Port Dickson	Saiful Bukhari Azlan (IND)	82	0.19%	Mohd Nazari Mokhtar (PAS)	7,456	17.14%	43,489	23,560	58.25%
2018	P132 Port Dickson	Saiful Bukhari Azlan (IND)	82	0.19%	Mohd Isa Abdul Samad (IND)	4,230	9.73%	43,489	23,560	58.25%
2018	P132 Port Dickson	Saiful Bukhari Azlan (IND)	82	0.19%	Stevie Chan Keng Leong (IND)	337	0.78%	43,489	23,560	58.25%
2018	P132 Port Dickson	Saiful Bukhari Azlan (IND)	82	0.19%	Lau Seck Yan (IND)	214	0.49%	43,489	23,560	58.25%
2018	P132 Port Dickson	Saiful Bukhari Azlan (IND)	82	0.19%	Kan Chee Yuen (IND)	154	0.35%	43,489	23,560	58.25%

== See also ==
- Anwar Ibrahim sodomy trials – 2008 allegation
