= Koh Kim Swee =

Malaysian politician

Yang Berhormat Koh Kim Swee MLA
- 许金水

Member of the Negeri Sembilan State Legislative Assembly for Repah
- Incumbent
- Assumed office 1 August 2026
- Preceded by: Veerapan Superamaniam

Personal details
- Citizenship: Malaysian
- Party: MCA
- Other political affiliations: Barisan Nasional
- Occupation: Politician

Yang Berhormat Sdr. Koh Kim Swee (Chinese: 许金水), or well known as Ah Swee (Chinese: 阿水) and Swee Gor (Chinese: 水哥) is a Malaysian politician from Tampin, Negeri Sembilan. He currently served as Member of the Negeri Sembilan State Legislative Assembly (MLA) for Repah since 1 August 2026. He is a member of the Malaysian Chinese Association (MCA), a component party of the Barisan Nasional (BN) coalition.

== Political background ==
In the MCA, Kim Swee served as Negeri Sembilan State Committee Liaison Secretary and Tampin Division Chief.

In 2026 Negeri Sembilan state election, Ah Swee has elected as Repah state Assemblyman.
