= Mustapha Nagoor =

Malaysian politician

Yang Berhormat Dato' Mustapha Nagoor DPNS DNS ANS PJK MLA
- مصطفى ناقور

Member of the Negeri Sembilan State Executive Council
- Incumbent
- Assumed office 24 August 2023 (Youth and Sports Development)
- Monarch: Muhriz
- Menteri Besar: Aminuddin Harun
- Preceded by: Mohamad Taufek Abd Ghani
- Constituency: Palong

Member of the Negeri Sembilan State Legislative Assembly for Palong
- Incumbent
- Assumed office 9 May 2018
- Preceded by: Lilah Yasin (BN–UMNO)
- Majority: 6,246 (2018); 564 (2023)

Personal details
- Party: United Malays National Organisation (UMNO)
- Other political affiliations: Barisan Nasional (BN)
- Education: University of Tasmania (MBA)
- Occupation: Politician
- Profession: Educator

Mustapha bin Nagoor is a Malaysian politician who has served as Member of the Negeri Sembilan State Executive Council (EXCO) in the Pakatan Harapan (PH) state administration under Menteri Besar Aminuddin Harun since August 2023 and Member of the Negeri Sembilan State Legislative Assembly for Palong since May 2018. He is a member, State Secretary and Division Chief of Jempol of the United Malay National Organisation (UMNO), a major component party in the Barisan Nasional (BN) coalition.

== Election results ==
Negeri Sembilan State Legislative Assembly
Year	Constituency	Candidate	Votes	Pct	Opponent(s)	Votes	Pct	Ballots cast	Majority	Turnout
2018	N06 Palong	Mustapha Nagoor (UMNO)	9,575	66.15%	Abdul Rahman Jaafar (PKR)	3,329	23.00%	14,807	6,246	81.49%
2018	N06 Palong	Mustapha Nagoor (UMNO)	9,575	66.15%	Masdi Musa (PAS)	1,571	10.85%	14,807	6,246	81.49%
2023	N06 Palong	Mustapha Nagoor (UMNO)	7,940	51.84%	Noor Azman Parmin (BERSATU)	7,376	48.16%	15,458	564	65.80%

== Honours ==
- Negeri Sembilan
  - Knight Commander of the Order of Loyalty to Negeri Sembilan (DPNS) – Dato' (2025)
  - Companion of the Order of Loyalty to Negeri Sembilan (DNS) (2005)
  - Member of the Order of Loyalty to Negeri Sembilan (ANS) (1999)
  - Recipient of the Meritorious Service Medal (PJK) (1998)
