= Wisma Negeri, Negeri Sembilan =

Government building in Seremban, Negeri Sembilan, Malaysia

Coordinates: 2°43′34″N 101°56′32″E

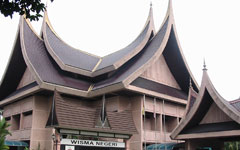
Wisma Negeri

Wisma Negeri is Negeri Sembilan's state secretariat building. It was built in 1987 and located at Seremban, Negeri Sembilan, Malaysia. It houses the machineries of the state government, including Menteri Besar's (Chief Minister's) office, Housing and local government unit office and Hall and protocol unit.

== Architecture ==
The building is designed based on Minangkabau architecture, a symbolic representation of Negeri Sembilan's historical connections with the Pagaruyung Kingdom, and the state's unique Minangkabau culture.
