= Palong (state constituency) =

Political subdivision in Malaysia

Palong (N06)
Negeri Sembilan constituency

State constituency
- Legislature: Negeri Sembilan State Legislative Assembly
MLA
Mustapha Nagoor
BN
- Constituency created: 1984
- First contested: 1986
- Last contested: 2026

Demographics
- Electors (2023): 23,494

N06 Palong within Negeri Sembilan, as used for the 2023 and 2026 state elections

Palong is a state constituency in Negeri Sembilan, Malaysia, that has been represented in the Negeri Sembilan State Legislative Assembly.

The state constituency was first contested in 1986 and is mandated to return a single Assemblyman to the Negeri Sembilan State Legislative Assembly under the first-past-the-post voting system.

== Demographics ==
Ethnic breakdown of Palong's electorate as of 2026
1. Malay (92.3%)
2. Indian (5.70%)
3. Chinese (1.60%)
4. Other ethnicities (0.40%)

== History ==
=== Polling districts ===
According to the gazette issued on 23 July 2026, the Palong constituency has a total of 9 polling districts.

State constituency	Polling districts	Code	Location
Palong (N06)	Palong 14, 15 & 16	127/06/01	SK Palong 14
Palong (N06)	Palong 8	127/06/02	SK Palong 8 (FELDA)
Palong (N06)	Palong 12 & 13	127/06/03	SK (FELDA) Palong 12
Palong (N06)	Palong 7	127/06/04	SK (FELDA) Palong 7
Palong (N06)	Palong 9, 10 & 11	127/02/05	SMK Palong 11; SK (FELDA) Palong 9
Palong (N06)	Palong 6	127/06/06	SMK Seri Perpatih (Palong 6)
Palong (N06)	Palong 5	127/06/07	SK (FELDA) Palong 5
Palong (N06)	Palong 4	127/06/08	SK (FELDA) Palong 4
Palong (N06)	Palong 3	127/06/09	SK (FELDA) Palong 3

=== Representation history ===
Members of Assembly for Palong
Assembly	No	Years	Name	Party
Constituency created from Rompin
7th	N08	1986-1990	Baharudin Hassan	BN (UMNO)
8th	N08	1990-1995	Baharudin Hassan	BN (UMNO)
9th	N08	1995-1999	Kamaruddin Mohd Din	BN (UMNO)
10th	N08	1999-2004	Kamaruddin Mohd Din	BN (UMNO)
11th	N06	2004-2008	Aziz Shamsudin	BN (UMNO)
12th	N06	2008-2013	Aziz Shamsudin	BN (UMNO)
13th	N06	2013-2018	Lilah Yasin	BN (UMNO)
14th	N06	2018-2023	Mustapha Nagoor	BN (UMNO)
15th	N06	2023–2026	Mustapha Nagoor	BN (UMNO)
16th	N06	2026–present	Mustapha Nagoor	BN (UMNO)

== Election results ==
Negeri Sembilan state election, 2026
Party	Candidate	Votes	%	∆%
BN	Mustapha Nagoor	15,197	87.94	▲36.10
PH	Muhammad Zahin Zinal Abidin	1,495	8.65	▲8.65
BERSATU	Rebin Birham	590	3.41	▲3.41
Total valid votes		17,282	100.00	
Total rejected ballots		157		
Unreturned ballots		16		
Turnout		17,455	74.10	▲8.30
Registered electors		23,555		
Majority		13,702	79.28	▲75.60
BN hold		Swing		

Negeri Sembilan state election, 2023
Party	Candidate	Votes	%	∆%
BN	Mustapha Nagoor	7,940	51.84	▼14.66
PN	Noor Azman Parmin	7,376	48.16	▲48.16
Total valid votes		15,316	100.00	
Total rejected ballots		121		
Unreturned ballots		21		
Turnout		15,458	65.80	▼15.69
Registered electors		23,494		
Majority		564	3.68	▼39.47
BN hold		Swing		

Negeri Sembilan state election, 2018
Party	Candidate	Votes	%	∆%
BN	Mustapha Nagoor	9,575	66.15	▼14.66
PKR	Nor Arzemi Nordin	3,329	23.00	▲3.81
PAS	Masdi Musa	1,571	10.85	▲10.85
Total valid votes		14,475	100.00	
Total rejected ballots		246		
Unreturned ballots		86		
Turnout		14,807	81.49	▼5.70
Registered electors		18,170		
Majority		6,246	43.15	▼18.47
BN hold		Swing		

Negeri Sembilan state election, 2013
Party	Candidate	Votes	%	∆%
BN	Lilah Yasin	11,090	80.81	▲11.00
PKR	Rebin Birham	2,634	19.19	▼11.00
Total valid votes		13,724	100.00	
Total rejected ballots		209		
Unreturned ballots		55		
Turnout		13,988	87.19	▲7.68
Registered electors		16,044		
Majority		8,456	61.62	▲18.00
BN hold		Swing		

Negeri Sembilan state election, 2008
Party	Candidate	Votes	%	∆%
BN	Aziz Shamsuddin	6,942	71.81	▼7.42
PKR	Rebin Birham	2,725	28.19	▲7.42
Total valid votes		9,667	100.00	
Total rejected ballots		325		
Unreturned ballots		0		
Turnout		9,992	79.51	▼1.47
Registered electors		12,567		
Majority		4,217	43.62	▼14.84
BN hold		Swing		

Negeri Sembilan state election, 2004
Party	Candidate	Votes	%	∆%
BN	Aziz Shamsuddin	7,245	79.23	▲5.70
PKR	Rebin Birham	1,899	20.77	▲20.77
Total valid votes		9,144	100.00	
Total rejected ballots		183		
Unreturned ballots		10		
Turnout		9,337	80.98	▼0.08
Registered electors		11,530		
Majority		5,346	58.46	▲11.40
BN hold		Swing		

Negeri Sembilan state election, 1999
Party	Candidate	Votes	%	∆%
BN	Kamaruddin Mohd Din	6,576	73.53	▼11.18
PKR	Mohammad Shariffuddin Musim	2,367	26.47	▲26.47
Total valid votes		8,943	100.00	
Total rejected ballots		228		
Unreturned ballots		0		
Turnout		9,171	81.06	▼2.27
Registered electors		11,314		
Majority		4,209	47.06	▼26.22
BN hold		Swing		

Negeri Sembilan state election, 1995
Party	Candidate	Votes	%	∆%
BN	Kamaruddin Mohd Din	7,398	84.71	▲6.19
S46	Ramli Md Nor	998	11.43	▼10.05
PAS	Ghazalli Khamis	337	3.86	▲3.86
Total valid votes		8,733	100.00	
Total rejected ballots		167		
Unreturned ballots		5		
Turnout		8,905	83.33	▼1.78
Registered electors		10,686		
Majority		6,400	73.29	▲16.24
BN hold		Swing		

Negeri Sembilan state election, 1990
Party	Candidate	Votes	%	∆%
BN	Baharudin Hassan	9,220	78.52	▼10.66
S46	Mohd Sani Hussin	2,522	21.48	▲21.48
Total valid votes		11,742	100.00	
Total rejected ballots		347		
Unreturned ballots		5		
Turnout		12,094	85.12	▲5.03
Registered electors		14,209		
Majority		6,698	57.04	▼21.33
BN hold		Swing		

Negeri Sembilan state election, 1986
Party	Candidate	Votes	%
BN	Baharudin Hassan	7,117	89.19
PAS	Mohamed Ganti Sudin	863	10.81
Total valid votes		7,980	100.00
Total rejected ballots		221	
Unreturned ballots		0	
Turnout		8,201	80.08
Registered electors		10,241	
Majority		6,254	78.37
This was a new constituency created.
