= Mohd Isa Abdul Samad =

Malaysian politician

Yang Berbahagia Dato' Seri Utama Mohd Isa Abdul Samad SPNS SUMW DSNS
- محمد عيسى عبدالصمد

Minister of Federal Territories
- In office 27 March 2004 – 16 October 2005
- Monarch: Sirajuddin
- Prime Minister: Abdullah Ahmad Badawi
- Preceded by: Sulaiman Daud (before ministry abolished 1981 & recreated 2004)
- Succeeded by: Shahrizat Abdul Jalil

6th Menteri Besar of Negeri Sembilan
- In office 29 April 1982 – 24 March 2004
- Monarch: Ja'afar
- Preceded by: Rais Yatim
- Succeeded by: Mohamad Hasan

Member of the Malaysian Parliament for Jempol
- In office 2004–2008
- Preceded by: Khalid Yunus
- Succeeded by: Lilah Yasin
- In office 2013–2018
- Preceded by: Lilah Yasin
- Succeeded by: Mohd Salim Sharif

Member of the Negeri Sembilan State Legislative Assembly for Bagan Pinang
- In office 2008–2013
- Preceded by: Azman Mohd Noor
- Succeeded by: Hairudin Abu Bakar

Member of the Negeri Sembilan State Legislative Assembly for Linggi
- In office 1978–2004
- Preceded by: Samad Said
- Succeeded by: Ismail Taib

Personal details
- Born: Mohd Isa bin Abdul Samad; 14 November 1949 (age 76) Malacca, Federation of Malaya (now Malaysia)
- Citizenship: Malaysian
- Party: Independent (2018–2023); UMNO (1978–2018, 2023–present)
- Other political affiliations: Barisan Nasional (1978–2018, 2023-present)
- Spouse(s): Hazizah Tumin (m. 1977 – d. 2005); Bibi Sharliza Mohd Khalid (m. 2010)
- Children: Najib, Megawati, Lelawati and Juhaida
- Education: University of Malaya
- Occupation: Politician
- Website: Official Blog
- Criminal information
- Status: Imprisoned since 10 February 2026
- Convictions: 9 counts of graft
- Penalty: 6 years imprisonment and RM15.45 million fine

Details
- Imprisoned at: Sungai Buloh Prison

Mohd Isa bin Abdul Samad (Jawi: محمد عيسى بن عبدالصمد; born 14 November 1949) is a Malaysian politician. He was the sixth and longest serving Menteri Besar of Negeri Sembilan for 22 years from April 1982 to March 2004 and was a Minister of Federal Territories (2004–2005). Isa was a member and former vice-president of United Malays National Organisation (UMNO), a component of the Barisan Nasional (BN) coalition until 2018 when he quit to become an independent.

He was also the former chairman of Federal Land Development Authority (FELDA), Felda Global Ventures Holdings (FGV) and Land Public Transport Commission (SPAD).

Isa is currently serving a six years long prison term since 10 February 2026 at the Sungai Buloh Prison due to his conviction on corruption charges.

== Early life ==
Isa was born on 14 November 1949 in Malacca, Malaysia and was educated at Sekolah Kebangsaan Bagan Pinang, Port Dickson and then attended Alam Shah School, Kuala Lumpur. He earned a Bachelor of Arts in Education degree from the University of Malaya before serving as a teacher at Sekolah Datuk Abdul Razak, Seremban from 1973–1978.

He was firstly married to Hazizah Tumin on 26 November 1977. Hazizah died at the Universiti Kebangsaan Malaysia Hospital (HUKM) in Cheras, Kuala Lumpur on 7 December 2005 after suffering from parotid cancer for the past 10 years since 1995. Their children are Mohamad Najib, Megawati, Lelawati and Juhaida.

He later remarried to former Negeri Sembilan Puteri UMNO chief Bibi Sharliza Mohd Khalid (born 1971), who was a widow with children from a previous marriage on 14 April 2010 at her home in Taman Fatimah at Kuala Pilah, Negeri Sembilan.

== Politics ==
Isa started his political career in 1978 by winning the Linggi state seat. His UMNO membership number was No. 22. Then he was appointed State Assemblyman (EXCO) of Negeri Sembilan until the 1982 elections. At the grassroots, he was UMNO Teluk Kemang Head of Port Dickson until his resignation in 2018.

In 1993, Isa contested the post of UMNO Youth chief but he lost to Rahim Thamby Chik. In the 1999 general election, Isa Samad defeated Dr. Rosli Yaakop of PAS in his area, Linggi.

In the UMNO 2000 General Assembly, Isa contested the UMNO vice-president's post but lost. Majority of the losers were Abu Hassan Omar, Osu Sukam and Abdul Ghani Othman.

In the 2004 general election Isa contested in the Jempol parliamentary constituency. Prior to this, the Jempol parliamentary seat was won by BN's Khalid Yunus.

Isa was later appointed by the prime minister Minister of the Federal Territory until 2005.

Isa won the UMNO vice-president's post for 2004–2007 with 1,507 votes, the highest against Melaka Chief Minister Mohd Ali Rustam (1,329 votes) and Minister of International Trade and Industry at the time, Muhyiddin Yassin (1,234 votes). However, his victory was revoked as he was convicted of money politics.

=== Bagan Pinang by-election ===
Following the death of Bagan Pinang assemblyman Azman Mohammad Noor, Isa was nominated as a BN candidate against Pakatan Rakyat candidate from PAS, Zulkefly Mohamad Omar in a by-election on 11 October 2008. Isa received 8,013 votes, while Zulkefly had 2,578 votes; won with a larger majority, 5,435 votes,

=== Port Dickson by-election of 2018 ===
Isa quits UMNO to contest as an independent candidate in the by-election of Port Dickson parliamentary seat held on 13 October 2018 after it was vacated by its incumbent Danyal Balagopal Abdullah to enable the leader of People's Justice Party (PKR) Anwar Ibrahim to contest and be elected to the parliament. He somehow just managed to get 4,230 votes (9.7%) to be in third place in the seven-corners contest won by Anwar and lost his electoral deposit.

== Controversies ==
=== UMNO Vice Presidency ===
The UMNO Disciplinary Board chaired by Tengku Ahmad Rithauddeen Tengku Ismail suspended Isa's membership for six years (2005 to 2011) on money politics in the UMNO General Assembly 2004 after winning the vice-president's post for being guilty five of nine money politics charges involving organizing meetings, organizing and giving money to buy votes. On 6 July 2005, the UMNO Supreme Council (MT) rejected the appeal of Isa Samad but reduced the suspension from 6 years to 3 years and UMNO secretary-general Tengku Adnan Tengku Mansor sent a letter to Isa on 23 June 2008.

Isa's case is related to a statement by Rais Yatim about 18 people to be detained for investigation by the Malaysian Anti-Corruption Commission (MACC). At that time Rais Yatim was the Minister of Justice of Malaysia.

Following suspension of membership, Isa resigned as Federal Territory Minister on 17 October 2005.

=== FELDA Chairmanship ===
On 27 December 2010, Prime Minister's Office said Isa appointed chairman of the Federal Land Development Authority (FELDA) effective 1 January 2011, replacing Dr Mohd Yusof Noor appointed an Advisor to the Minister responsible for FELDA.

On June 20, 2012, the 31st FELDA Capital Cooperative Annual General Meeting (KPF) was held at Dewan Perdana FELDA, Kuala Lumpur with strict control of the police. Isa Samad as FELDA chairman (contract only) will not be present because of the Kuala Lumpur High Court order as he is not a settler, energetic son or FELDA staff. Judge Abang Iskandar Abang Hashim explained that there was merit to allow four FELDA settlers to challenge Isa' membership in KPF and his membership in a frozen cooperative. Lawyer Mohamed Hanipa Maidin from Mohamed Hanifa & Associates representing applicants Abdul Talib Ali, Abdul Mubin Abdul Rahman, Abdul Razak Mohammad and Muhamad Noor Atan while Senior Federal Counsel Shamsul Bolhassan represented the respondents namely the Cooperative Commission of Malaysia Cooperation Commission (SKM), SKM and KPF. On 23 May 2012, the SKM dispute reference panel, SKM has confirmed the membership of Isa despite acknowledging that the appointment of Isa was illegal.

Mazlan Aliman of the National Felda Settlers' Children Association (ANAK) opposes Felda Global Ventures Holdings Berhad (FGVH) listing on Bursa Malaysia. Child Economy Developer Dr Rosli Yaakop disappointed with Minister Ismail Sabri Yaakob for setting aside the by-laws in the Cooperative Commission Act to exclude certain individuals from complying with the requirements of the KPF by-laws (June 5, 2012).

=== FGV Chairmanship ===
Isa as chairman of Felda Global Ventures Holdings (FGV) Bhd has been in conflict with chief executive officer, Zakaria Arshad. Isa was transferred from FGV once he has resigned to be the acting chairman of Land Public Transport Commission (SPAD) on 19 June 2017.

=== SPAD Chairmanship ===
After the 2018 general election that saw the downfall of BN government, on 23 May 2018 the new Pakatan Harapan (PH) Prime Minister Dr. Mahathir Mohamad announced that the SPAD was to be abolished and Transport Minister Anthony Loke told Isa to resign from SPAD chairman within a week. Isa resigned as SPAD chairman on 29 May 2018.

=== FGV legal suits ===
On 23 November 2018, FGV filed a suit against former chairman, Isa and former group president and chief executive officer, Mohd Emir Mavani Abdullah and 12 others for RM514 million and other damages in relation to the acquisition of London-listed Asian Plantations Ltd in 2014. On 30 November 2018, FGV filed another suit against Isa, Emir seeking relief totalling RM7.69 million in relation to the purchase of two luxury condominiums at Troika, Persiaran KLCC at prices significantly above market value, without proper due diligence and/or unauthorised use and possession of the units.

=== FELDA CBT and bribery case ===
On 14 December 2018, Isa has claimed trial to a charge of criminal breach of trust (CBT) and nine counts of receiving graft involving more than RM3mil as FELDA Chairman at Kuala Lumpur Sessions Court. The first charge, he allegedly committed CBT by approving the purchase of Merdeka Palace & Suites Hotel without the approval from the Felda board of directors on 29 April 2014. Mohd Isa was also charged with receiving bribes of RM100,000; RM140,000; RM300,000; RM250,000; RM500,000; RM500,000; RM300,000; 500,000; and RM500,000 totalling RM3.09mil from Gagasan Abadi Properties Sdn Bhd director Ikhwan Zaidel between July 2014 and December 2015 as well as through Muhammad Zahid Md Arip, who was the Prime Minister's political secretary then, as gratification for helping approve the hotel's purchase for RM160mil.

The High Court had on 3 February 2021 convicted Isa and sentenced him to six years in jail and RM15.45 million fine. However, his conviction was unanimously overturned by the Court of Appeal on 6 March 2024 and he was acquitted of all counts of corruption charges. The prosecution then filed for an appeal to the Federal Court the following day. On 10 February 2026, the Federal Court allowed the appeal and reinstated the conviction and sentence of Isa. As he exhausted his last legal venue, he was ordered to begin his prison sentence at the Sungai Buloh Prison immediately. His wife Bibi Sharliza was seen crying at the public gallery when the sentence was announced, while his other family members were also seen hugging each other.

== Election results ==
Negeri Sembilan State Legislative Assembly
Year	Constituency	Candidate	Votes	Pct	Opponent(s)	Votes	Pct	Ballots cast	Majority	Turnout
1978	N20 Linggi	Mohd Isa Abdul Samad (UMNO)			N/A					
1982	N20 Linggi	Mohd Isa Abdul Samad (UMNO)			N/A					
1986	N26 Linggi	Mohd Isa Abdul Samad (UMNO)			N/A					
1990	N26 Linggi	Mohd Isa Abdul Samad (UMNO)	5,447	78.03%	Jorji Harun (S46)	1,311	18.78%	6,981	4,136	76.93%
1995	N29 Linggi	Mohd Isa Abdul Samad (UMNO)	6,807	85.24%	Mohd Nordin Ahmad (S46)	483	6.05%	7,986	6,324	73.64%
1995	N29 Linggi	Mohd Isa Abdul Samad (UMNO)	6,807	85.24%	Mustapa Manap (IND)	467	5.85%	7,986	6,324	73.64%
1999	N29 Linggi	Mohd Isa Abdul Samad (UMNO)	5,543	67.09%	Rosli Yaakop (PAS)	2,465	29.84%	8,262	3,078	73.56%
2009	N31 Bagan Pinang	Mohd Isa Abdul Samad (UMNO)	8,013	75.66%	Zulkefly Mohamad Omar (PAS)	2,578	24.34%	11,170	5,435	81.75%

Parliament of Malaysia
Year	Constituency	Candidate	Votes	Pct	Opponent(s)	Votes	Pct	Ballots cast	Majority	Turnout
2004	P127 Jempol	Mohd Isa Abdul Samad (UMNO)	26,360	73.96%	Mohamad Fozi Md Zain (PAS)	9,280	26.04%	36,985	17,080	73.16%
2013	P127 Jempol	Mohd Isa Abdul Samad (UMNO)	31,124	58.05%	Wan Aishah Wan Ariffin (PAS)	22,495	41.95%	54,858	8,629	54,858%
2018	P132 Port Dickson	Mohd Isa Abdul Samad (IND)	4,230	9.73%	Anwar Ibrahim (PKR)	31,016	71.32%	43,489	23,560	58.25%
2018	P132 Port Dickson	Mohd Isa Abdul Samad (IND)	4,230	9.73%	Mohd Nazari Mokhtar (PAS)	7,456	17.14%	43,489	23,560	58.25%
2018	P132 Port Dickson	Mohd Isa Abdul Samad (IND)	4,230	9.73%	Stevie Chan Keng Leong (IND)	337	0.78%	43,489	23,560	58.25%
2018	P132 Port Dickson	Mohd Isa Abdul Samad (IND)	4,230	9.73%	Lau Seck Yan (IND)	214	0.49%	43,489	23,560	58.25%
2018	P132 Port Dickson	Mohd Isa Abdul Samad (IND)	4,230	9.73%	Kan Chee Yuen (IND)	154	0.35%	43,489	23,560	58.25%
2018	P132 Port Dickson	Mohd Isa Abdul Samad (IND)	4,230	9.73%	Saiful Bukhari Azlan (IND)	82	0.19%	43,489	23,560	58.25%

== Honours ==
=== Honours of Malaysia ===
- Malaysia
  - Commander of the Order of Loyalty to the Crown of Malaysia (PSM) – Tan Sri (1991, revoked on 8 June 2026)
- Federal Territory (Malaysia)
  - Grand Knight of the Order of the Territorial Crown (SUMW) – Datuk Seri Utama (2013)
- Negeri Sembilan
  - Knight Grand Commander of the Order of Loyalty to Negeri Sembilan (SPNS) – Dato' Seri Utama (1991)
  - Knight Companion of the Order of Loyalty to Negeri Sembilan (DSNS) – Dato' (1982)

Political offices
Preceded by Rais Yatim	9th Menteri Besar of Negeri Sembilan; 1982-2004	Succeeded by Mohamad Hasan
