= Lilah Yasin =

Malaysian politician

Yang Berbahagia Dato' Lilah Yassin DSNS
- ليلى ياسين

Member of the Malaysian Parliament for Jempol
- In office 8 March 2008 – 5 May 2013
- Preceded by: Mohd Isa Abdul Samad (BN–UMNO)
- Succeeded by: Mohd Isa Abdul Samad (BN–UMNO)
- Majority: 12,320 (2008)

Personal details
- Born: Lilah bin Yasin Negeri Sembilan, Federation of Malaya (now Malaysia)
- Citizenship: Malaysian
- Party: United Malays National Organisation (UMNO)
- Other political affiliations: Barisan Nasional (BN); Perikatan Nasional (PN); Muafakat Nasional (MN)
- Occupation: Politician

Lilah bin Yasin is a Malaysian politician. He was the member of the Negeri Sembilan State Legislative Assembly for Palong (2013-2018), Serting (1995-2008) and Batu Kikir (1986-1995). From 2008 to 2013 he was the Member of the Parliament of Malaysia for the Jempol constituency in Negeri Sembilan. He is a member of the United Malay National Organisation (UMNO) party in the governing Barisan Nasional coalition.

In addition, Lilah used to be a member of the State Executive Council of Negeri Sembilan, and held the State Assembly seat of Serting until 2008. He was elected to federal Parliament in the 2008 election, winning the seat of Jempol. In 2013 he returned to the Negeri Sembilan State Assembly, winning the seat of Palong, while former Negeri Sembilan Chief Minister, Mohd Isa Abdul Samad accepted UMNO's nomination for Jempol.

== Election results ==
Negeri Sembilan State Legislative Assembly
Year	Constituency	Candidate	Votes	Pct	Opponent(s)	Votes	Pct	Ballots cast	Majority	Turnout
1986	N06 Batu Kikir	Lilah Yasin (UMNO)	3,783	85.03%	Azarai Omar (PAS)	666	14.97%	4,622	3,117	69.44%
1990	N06 Batu Kikir	Lilah Yasin (UMNO)	3,077	62.67%	Rais Yatim (S46)	1,833	37.33%	5,144	1,244	74.80%
1995	N05 Serting	Lilah Yasin (UMNO)								
1999	N05 Serting	Lilah Yasin (UMNO)	6,066	64.89%	Ramli Abu Bakar (PAS)	2,936	31.41%	9,600	3,130	76.07%
1999	N05 Serting	Lilah Yasin (UMNO)	6,066	64.89%	Md Zin Udin (IND)	346	3.70%	9,600	3,130	76.07%
2004	N05 Serting	Lilah Yasin (UMNO)	7,787	75.29%	Ramli Abu Bakar (PAS)	2,556	24.71%	10,538	5,231	75.19%
2013	N06 Palong	Lilah Yasin (UMNO)	11,090	80.81%	Rebin Birham (PKR)	2,634	19.19%	13,933	8,456	86.84%

Parliament of Malaysia
Year	Constituency	Candidate	Votes	Pct	Opponent(s)	Votes	Pct	Ballots cast	Majority	Turnout
2008	P127 Jempol	Lilah Yasin (UMNO)	25,294	66.10%	Siti Meriam Naam (PAS)	12,974	33.90%	39,322	12,320	73.53%

== Honours ==
- Negeri Sembilan
  - Knight Companion of the Order of Loyalty to Negeri Sembilan (DSNS) – Dato' (1992)
