= Serting (state constituency) =

Political subdivision in Malaysia

Serting (N05)
Negeri Sembilan constituency

State constituency
- Legislature: Negeri Sembilan State Legislative Assembly
MLA
Mohd Fairuz Mohd Isa
PN
- Constituency created: 1984
- First contested: 1986
- Last contested: 2026

Demographics
- Electors (2023): 30,287

N05 Serting within Negeri Sembilan, as used for the 2023 and 2026 state elections

Serting is a state constituency in Negeri Sembilan, Malaysia, that has been represented in the Negeri Sembilan State Legislative Assembly.

The state constituency was first contested in 1986 and is mandated to return a single Assemblyman to the Negeri Sembilan State Legislative Assembly under the first-past-the-post voting system.

== Demographics ==
Ethnic breakdown of Serting's electorate as of 2026
1. Malay (78.2%)
2. Chinese (12.0%)
3. Indian (8.70%)
4. Other ethnicities (1.10%)

== History ==
=== Polling districts ===
According to the gazette issued on 23 July 2026, the Serting constituency has a total of 11 polling districts.

State constituency	Polling districts	Code	Location
Serting（N05）	Serting Ulu	127/05/01	SK Serting Ulu
Serting（N05）	Kampong Serting Tengah	127/05/02	SMA Dato' Haji Mustafa
Serting（N05）	Kampong Serting Hilir	127/05/03	SK Tunku Muda Serting; SK Serting Hilir
Serting（N05）	Lubok Gadong	127/05/04	Pusat Komuniti Desa Serting Hilir
Serting（N05）	Mahsan Jaya	127/05/05	SJK (C) Kg Mashan; SMK Bahau 2
Serting（N05）	FELDA Raja Alias	127/05/06	SMK Seri Jempol; SK Serting (FELDA); SK FELDA Raja Alias 3
Serting（N05）	Bandar Baru Serting Hilir	127/05/07	SK Serting Hilir Kompleks; SMK Serting Hilir Kompleks; SK (FELDA) Serting Hilir 2
Serting（N05）	Kampong Geddes	127/05/08	SJK (T) Ladang Geedes
Serting（N05）	Kampong Geddes Tengah	127/05/09	SJK (C) Chung Hua
Serting（N05）	Ladang Sungai Sebaling	127/05/10	SJK (T) Ldg Sg Sebaling
Serting（N05）	Bandar Seri Jempol	127/05/11	SK Dato Penghulu Luak Jempol; SMK Bandar Baru Serting

=== Representation history ===
Members of Assembly for Serting
Assembly	No	Years	Name	Party
Constituency created from Rompin and Bahau
7th	N05	1986–1990	Ibrahim Ali	BN (UMNO)
8th	N05	1990–1995	Ibrahim Ali	BN (UMNO)
9th	N05	1995–1999	Lilah Yasin	BN (UMNO)
10th	N05	1999–2004	Lilah Yasin	BN (UMNO)
11th	N05	2004–2008	Lilah Yasin	BN (UMNO)
12th	N05	2008–2013	Shamshulkahar Mohd Deli	BN (UMNO)
13th	N05	2013–2018	Shamshulkahar Mohd Deli	BN (UMNO)
14th	N05	2018–2023	Shamshulkahar Mohd Deli	BN (UMNO)
15th	N05	2023–2025	Mohd Fairuz Mohd Isa	PN (PAS)
16th	N05	2026–present	Mohd Fairuz Mohd Isa	PN (PAS)

== Election results ==
Negeri Sembilan state election, 2026
Party	Candidate	Votes	%	∆%
PN	Mohd Fairuz Mohd Isa	16,608	76.05	▲23.92
PH	Yaacob Mahmood	4,493	20.58	▲20.58
BERSATU	Mohd Noraffendy Mohd Saleh	736	3.37	▲3.37
Total valid votes		21,837	100.00	
Total rejected ballots		258		
Unreturned ballots		23		
Turnout		22,118	72.28	▲6.39
Registered electors		30,599		
Majority		12,115	55.48	▲51.22
PN hold		Swing		

Negeri Sembilan state election, 2023
Party	Candidate	Votes	%	∆%
PN	Mohd Fairuz Mohd Isa	10,312	52.13	▲52.13
BN	Zamri Omar	9,469	47.87	▼7.61
Total valid votes		19,781	100.00	
Total rejected ballots		140		
Unreturned ballots		36		
Turnout		19,957	65.89	▼15.67
Registered electors		30,287		
Majority		843	4.26	▼17.11
PN gain from BN		Swing		?

Negeri Sembilan state election, 2018
Party	Candidate	Votes	%	∆%
BN	Shamshulkahar Mohd. Deli	9,782	55.48	▼11.35
PKR	Abd Rahman Ramli	6,014	34.11	▲34.11
PAS	Muhammad Alzukri Muhammad Yasin	1,837	10.42	▼22.75
Total valid votes		17,633	100.00	
Total rejected ballots		324		
Unreturned ballots		106		
Turnout		18,063	81.56	▼3.49
Registered electors		22,146		
Majority		3,768	21.37	▼12.29
BN hold		Swing		

Negeri Sembilan state election, 2013
Party	Candidate	Votes	%	∆%
BN	Shamshulkahar Mohd. Deli	10,807	66.83	
PAS	Muhammad Alzukri Muhammad Yasin	5,365	33.17	
Total valid votes		16,172	100.00	
Total rejected ballots		252		
Unreturned ballots		67		
Turnout		16,491	85.05	
Registered electors		19,389		
Majority		5,442	33.66	
BN hold		Swing		

Negeri Sembilan state election, 2008
Party	Candidate	Votes	%	∆%
BN	Shamshulkahar Mohd Deli	7,618	70.16	▼5.13
PAS	Somingon Nasir	3,240	29.84	▲5.13
Total valid votes		10,858	100.00	
Total rejected ballots		229		
Unreturned ballots		13		
Turnout		11,100	75.58	▲0.21
Registered electors		14,687		
Majority		4,378	40.32	▼10.25
BN hold		Swing		

Negeri Sembilan state election, 2004
Party	Candidate	Votes	%	∆%
BN	Lilah Yasin	7,787	75.29	▲10.40
PAS	Ramli Abu Bakar	2,556	24.71	▼6.70
Total valid votes		10,343	100.00	
Total rejected ballots		195		
Unreturned ballots		26		
Turnout		10,564	75.37	▼0.72
Registered electors		14,016		
Majority		5,231	50.58	▲17.09
BN hold		Swing		

Negeri Sembilan state election, 1999
Party	Candidate	Votes	%	∆%
BN	Lilah Yasin	6,066	64.89	▼19.17
PAS	Ramli Abu Bakar	2,936	31.41	▲31.41
Independent	Md. Zin Udin	346	3.70	▲3.70
Total valid votes		9,348	100.00	
Total rejected ballots		252		
Unreturned ballots		3		
Turnout		9,603	76.09	▲1.86
Registered electors		12,620		
Majority		3,130	33.48	▼34.63
BN hold		Swing		

Negeri Sembilan state election, 1995
Party	Candidate	Votes	%	∆%
BN	Lilah Yasin	7,133	84.06	▲14.03
S46	Zakaria Abd. Rahman	1,353	15.94	▼14.03
Total valid votes		8,486	100.00	
Total rejected ballots		262		
Unreturned ballots		9		
Turnout		8,757	74.23	▼4.94
Registered electors		11,797		
Majority		5,780	68.11	▲28.05
BN hold		Swing		

Negeri Sembilan state election, 1990
Party	Candidate	Votes	%	∆%
BN	Ibrahim Ali	6,178	70.03	▼17.31
S46	Zainal Maarof	2,644	29.97	▲29.97
Total valid votes		8,822	100.00	
Total rejected ballots		350		
Unreturned ballots		7		
Turnout		9,179	79.17	▲6.31
Registered electors		11,594		
Majority		3,534	40.06	▼34.63
BN hold		Swing		

Negeri Sembilan state election, 1986
Party	Candidate	Votes	%
BN	Ibrahim Ali	5,031	87.34
PAS	Sundararajoo Ayasamy @ Mohamad Abdullah	729	12.66
Total valid votes		5,760	100.00
Total rejected ballots		279	
Unreturned ballots		0	
Turnout		6,039	72.86
Registered electors		8,288	
Majority		4,302	74.69
Constitutency created.
