= Jalan Nyalas =

Road in Malaysia

Malacca and Negeri Sembilan M15 or N15
- Jalan Nyalas

Major junctions
- South end: Kampung Chodong
- M2 Jalan Durian Tunggal–Tangkak; FT 144 Federal Route 144; M123 Jalan Bekoh; M125 Jalan Asahan–Jementah; M8 State Route M8; N18 Jalan Ayer Kuning; FT 1 Federal Route 1
- North end: Kampung Sungai Dua

Location
- Country: Malaysia
- Primary destinations: Ayer Kuning Selatan, Nyalas, Guba, Simpang Bekoh, Kampung Chabau, Jasin

Highway system
- Highways in Malaysia; Expressways; Federal; State

Jalan Nyalas, (Malacca State Route M15/Negeri Sembilan State Route N15) is a major road in Malacca and Negeri Sembilan state, Malaysia.

== History ==
In 2024, Jalan Nyalas at Simpang Bekoh sections had closed several days twice for constructions.

== Features ==
- Simpang Bekoh – Transportation hubs of Malacca–Johor border
- Nyalas

=== Alternative routes ===
- M125/J277 Jalan Asahan–Jementah – To Asahan, Jementah and Segamat.

== Junction lists ==
Legend:

- I/C - Interchange, I/S - Intersection, RSA - Rest and service area, OBR - Overhead bridge restaurant, R/R - Restaurant and rest plaza, L/B - Layby, V/P - Vista point, TN - tunnel, T/P - Toll plaza, BR - Bridge
- C - Cloverleaf, S - Stack, T-A - Trumpet-A, T-B - Trumpet-B, DT - Directional-T/Y, SDT - Semi-Directional-T/Y, P-Y - Partial-Y, D - Diamond, P-C - Partial cloverleaf, D-D - Diverging diamond, D-R - Direct ramp

State	District	Location	km	mi	Name	Destinations	Notes
Malacca	Jasin	Simpang Bekoh			Kampung Chodong	M2 Jalan Durian Tunggal–Tangkak – Jasin, Merlimau, Batu Berendam, Malacca City; J21 Jalan Sialang – Tangkak, Bukit Gambir, Muar, Jementah, Segamat; North–South Expressway Southern Route / AH2 – Kuala Lumpur, Johor Bahru	T-junctions
Malacca	Jasin	Simpang Bekoh			Kampung Chabau	FT 144 Malaysia Federal Route 144 – Jasin, Malacca	T-junctions
Malacca	Jasin	Simpang Bekoh			Simpang Bekoh	M123 Jalan Bekoh – Tangkak, Muar, Jementah, Segamat; North–South Expressway Southern Route / AH2 – Kuala Lumpur, Johor Bahru	T-junctions
Malacca	Jasin	Simpang Bekoh			Jalan Asahan	M125 Jalan Asahan–Jementah – Asahan, Bukit Asahan, Kampung Relau, Jementah, Segamat	T-junctions
Malacca	Jasin	Simpang Bekoh			Masjid Baharu		
Malacca	Jasin	Nyalas			Guba		
Malacca	Jasin	Nyalas			Nyalas	M8 Malacca State Route M8 – Selandar, Alor Gajah; M167 Jalan Bukit Senggeh – FELDA Bukit Senggeh	Junctions
Malacca	Jasin	Nyalas			Jalan Kampung Putus	M18 Jalan Kampung Putus – Kampung Putus	T-junctions
Negeri Sembilan	Tampin	Air Kuning Selatan			Kampung Muntai		
Negeri Sembilan	Tampin	Air Kuning Selatan			Kampung Ulu Ayer Kining		
Negeri Sembilan	Tampin	Air Kuning Selatan			Ayer Kuning Estate		
Negeri Sembilan	Tampin	Air Kuning Selatan			Railway crossing bridge		
Negeri Sembilan	Tampin	Air Kuning Selatan			Air Kuning Selatan	N18 Jalan Air Kuning – Batang Melaka, Gemencheh, Tampin	T-junctions
Negeri Sembilan	Tampin	Air Kuning Selatan			Kampung Bahru		
Negeri Sembilan	Tampin	Air Kuning Selatan			Kampung Sungai Dua	FT 1 Malaysia Federal Route 1 – Gemencheh, Tampin, Bahau, Rompin, Gemas, Segamat	T-junctions
1.000 mi = 1.609 km; 1.000 km = 0.621 mi
