= Simpang Bekoh =

Town in Jasin, Malacca, Malaysia

Simpang Bekoh 新邦木阁
- Town
- Interactive map of Simpang Bekoh
- Coordinates: 2°21′27″N 102°30′43″E
- Country: Malaysia
- State: Malacca
- District: Jasin

Government
  - Ruling party: BN-UMNO
  - MLA Asahan (N10): Fairul Nizam Roslan
- Time zone: UTC+8 (MST)
  - Summer (DST): Not observed
- Website: www.mpjasin.gov.my

Simpang Bekoh (Chinese: 新邦木阁), is a border town in Jasin District in the Malaysian state of Malacca, which is located near the state border with Johor. Simpang Bekoh established in 1945. The Simpang Bekoh also well known as Simpang locally.

== History ==
On 21 July 2025, fourteen wooden shoplots, some over 100 years old, were destroyed in a fire.

Since Simpang Bekoh is located near the state border with Johor, Simpang Bekoh become transportation hubs. If any constructions ongoing in Simpang Bekoh, the traffic from Jalan Nyalas and Jalan Bekoh would be stuck or required to changed the directions passing through Nyalas and Kampung Parit Keliling to Jasin.

In 2024, the Jalan Nyalas passing through Simpang Bekoh had closed several days twice for constructions.

The Simpang Bekoh New Village become the first station in eight New Villages visiting in Jasin District, Malacca by Universiti Tunku Abdul Rahman (UTAR).

== Subarea ==
Taman Bekoh Jaya is located in Simpang Bekoh. It established in 1990s.

== Transport ==
=== Land ===
- M15/N15 Jalan Nyalas – crossing through this town.
- M123/J123 Jalan Bekoh – Main route to Tangkak, Muar and Segamat in Johor.
- M125/J277 Jalan Asahan–Jementah – Main route to Asahan, Kampung Relau and Jementah.
