= Segamat Inner Ring Road =

Road in Malaysia

Johor Route 152, 216 and 217
- Segamat Inner Ring Road

Route information
- Maintained by Malaysian Public Works Department (JKR) and Segamat Municipal Council (MPS)
- Length: 6 km (3.7 mi)
- Existed: 2001–present
- History: Completed in 2005

Major junctions
- From: Taman Pemuda, Segamat
- FT 1 Federal Route 1 J154 State Route J154; FT 1384 Federal Route 1384
- To: Kenawar Junctions

Location
- Country: Malaysia
- Primary destinations: Segamat town centre, Kampung Gubah, Kampung Abdullah

Highway system
- Highways in Malaysia; Expressways; Federal; State

Segamat Inner Ring Road, Johor State Routes J152, J216 and J217 is a 4-lane single carriageway municipal ring road system in Segamat, Johor, Malaysia. The ring road consists of Jalan Pemuda (Johor State Route J152), Jalan Hassan (Johor State Route J216), Segamat Second Bridge, Jalan Hassan Abdullah (both are Johor State Route J217), Jalan Pee Kang Hai and Jalan Chia Chin Koon.

== History ==
Before 20th century, the main medium of transportation in Segamat was via rivers. However, the mode of transportation in Segamat began to change when the British colonial government began constructing the national railroad system and road networks (Federal Route 1 and Federal Route 23 passing through Segamat. As a result, several municipal roads were also built as well to connect the nearby villages to Segamat.

Since then, Jalan Pemuda and Jalan Hassan were primarily used as bypass routes when the main road (Federal Route 1 were closed during special occasions and events. The traffic rate along Federal Route 1 continued to rise every year as a result of the population increase, therefore the 8-kilometer section of the main road in Segamat was upgraded to 4-lane single-carriageway (dual-carriageway in the town center) in 1985.

As a result of the rise of traffic rate, traffic jams are common especially at the main bridge of Segamat. As a result, the federal government of Malaysia decided to build a second bridge of Segamat to reduce traffic congestion at the main bridge. The construction of the bridge began at the end of 1998 and completed in 2001. Soon after the completion of the bridge, a new dual-carriageway road, Jalan Hassan Abdullah, was constructed by Malaysian Public Works Department (JKR) of Segamat, connecting the second bridge to Jalan Pee Kang Hai.

In 1996, Segamat was chosen as the state-level host of the Malaysian National Day. At that time, the detour routes especially the 2-lane Jalan Hassan and Jalan Pemuda were badly congested and were unable to handle the incredible volume of traffic during the celebration. As a result, the JKR of Segamat decided to develop an inner ring road system by upgrading the existing 2-lane municipal roads such as Jalan Pemuda, Jalan Hassan, Jalan Pee Kang Hai and Jalan Chia Chin Koon to 4-lane single carriageway. The construction of Segamat Second Bridge was also included in the ring road package. Construction began right after the completion of Segamat Second Bridge in 2001 and completed in August 2005, several weeks before National Day celebration of 2005.

After the completion of Segamat Inner Ring Road, the ring road was used to divert traffic when Segamat was once again chosen as the venue of the Johor state-level celebration of the 2005 Malaysian National Day. Unlike the 1996 celebration, the traffic flow was very smooth during the 2005 National Day celebration.

=== Segamat Second Bridge ===
On 25 September 2012, a student bus carried 30 students crashed by a car when turning to Jalan Genuang shortcut, leading 22 students and 2 drivers injured, included a 14-year-old student from SMJK Seg Hwa, which heavier injured. The people and business urge that should improve the safety of the Inner Ring Road.

On 7 October 2024, the Segamat Municipal Council planned to change the rural road to Bolling ball court as single direction way, and restrict crossing between rural road and Jalan Utama 2/3 and turn right to Kampung Abdullah from rural road.

In 2025 Segamat Earthquake, a 9-second Minnan voice rumour said that the Second Bridge was broken, however the Town Centre Councillor Eric Teo Kim San denied that rumour and show that the Second Bridge is still in well condition.

=== J216 Jalan Hassan ===
The former name of Jalan Hassan is Jalan Lubok Peradong. Around 1930, Jalan Lubok Peradong renamed to Jalan Hassan in conjunction of 100 years old old-people named Hassan bin Abd from Malacca. Pak Hassan is the first people bring the carriage in Segamat.

== Features ==
=== Overlaps ===
- J154 Johor State Route J154 (Laksamana Junctions–Kampung Tengah)

== Junction lists ==
The entire route is located in Segamat District, Johor.

Legend:

- I/C - Interchange, I/S - Intersection, RSA - Rest and service area, OBR - Overhead bridge restaurant, R/R - Restaurant and rest plaza, L/B - Layby, V/P - Vista point, TN - tunnel, T/P - Toll plaza, BR - Bridge
- C - Cloverleaf, S - Stack, T-A - Trumpet-A, T-B - Trumpet-B, DT - Directional-T/Y, SDT - Semi-Directional-T/Y, P-Y - Partial-Y, D - Diamond, P-C - Partial cloverleaf, D-D - Diverging diamond, D-R - Direct ramp

Location	km	mi	Name	Destinations	Notes
J152 Jalan Pemuda			Pemuda I/S	FT 1 Jalan Buloh Kasap – Seremban, Gemas, Buloh Kasap, Kuantan, Segamat town center, Tangkak	T-junctions
J152 Jalan Pemuda			Kampung Jalan Pemuda	Kampung Jalan Pemuda	
J152 Jalan Pemuda			Kampung Tengah	J154 Johor State Route J154 – Kampung Tengah, Kampung Tungku Tiga	T-junctions
J216 Jalan Hassan			Kampung Gubah	Kampung Gubah	
J216 Jalan Hassan			Jalan Arshad	Jalan Arshad – Jalan Hussin, Jalan Awang, Segamat High School	T-junctions
J216 Jalan Hassan			Jalan Sekolah	Jalan Sekolah – Jalan Awang, Segamat High School	T-junctions
J216 Jalan Hassan			TNB Segamat	TNB Segamat district branch office	
J216 Jalan Hassan			Laksamana I/S	Jalan Aji – Segamat town centre (Bandar Atas); J154 Jalan Sultan – Jementah, Tangkak, Muar (from Jementah only); North–South Expressway Southern Route / AH2 – Kuala Lumpur, Malacca	Junctions
J217 Jalan Hassan Abdullah			Segamat River bridge Segamat Second Bridge; Start/end of dual-carriageway		
J217 Jalan Hassan Abdullah			Taman Utama	Taman Utama, Inland Revenue Board of Malaysia (LHDN) district branch office	
J217 Jalan Hassan Abdullah			Pee Kang Hai I/S	Segamat town center (Bandar Seberang), KFC, McDonald's & Pizza Hut restaurants, Jalan Genuang	Junction; Start/end of dual-carriageway
Jalan Pee Kang Hai			Cenderawasih I/S	Jalan Syed Abudul Kadir – Taman Segar, Upwell Supermarket, Kampung Abdullah, Jalan Genuang	Junctions
Jalan Pee Kang Hai			Jalan Medoi	FT 1384 Malaysia Federal Route 1384 – Kampung Jawa, Shariff Motocross Circuit, FELDA Medoi	T-junctions
Jalan Pee Kang Hai			Taman Kemawan	Taman Kemawan; Jalan Meryani	T-junctions
Jalan Chia Chin Koon			Cowboy Hypermarket Segamat	Cowboy Hypermarket Segamat (back entrance)	Kampung Abdullah bound
Jalan Chia Chin Koon			Kenawar I/S	FT 1 Jalan Genuang – Segamat town center, Bukit Kepong, Muar, Labis, Yong Peng; North–South Expressway Southern Route / AH2 – Johor Bahru, Singapore	T-junctions
1.000 mi = 1.609 km; 1.000 km = 0.621 mi
