= Nyalas =

Town in Jasin, Malacca, Malaysia

Nyalas Nyaleh (Negeri Sembilan Malay)
- town
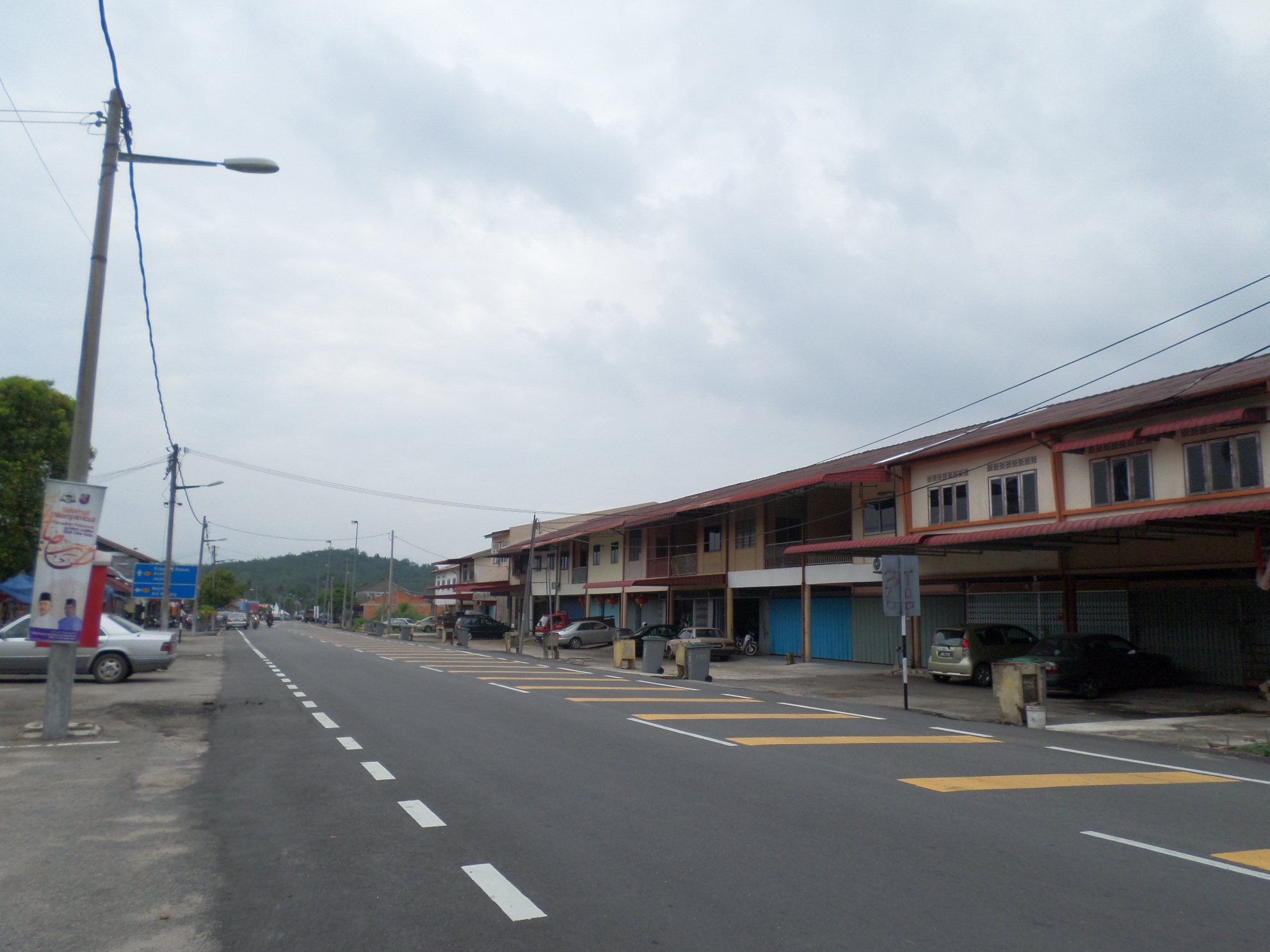
- Nyalas in Jasin District

- Location in Peninsular Malaysia
- Coordinates: 2°26′N 102°28′E
- Country: Malaysia
- State: Malacca
- District: Jasin
- Time zone: UTC+8 (MST)
  - Summer (DST): Not observed
- Postal code: 77100

Nyalas (Negeri Sembilan Malay: Nyaleh; Jawi: ڽالس) is a small town in Jasin District, Malacca, Malaysia. It is located at the state's northeastern corner, bordering Ayer Kuning in Tampin District, Negeri Sembilan.

== Economy ==
The economic drive for Nyalas is agricultural products and commodities, such as pomelo, rubber and palm oil.

== Tourist attractions ==
- Bukit Batu Lebah Recreational Forest - the recreational forest located near the town.

== Transport ==
=== Land ===
- M15/N15 Jalan Nyalas – crossing through this town.
- M8 Jalan Alor Gajah–Selandar – main route to Selandar, Alor Gajah.
- M125/J277 Jalan Asahan–Jementah – main route to Asahan, Kampung Relau; Jementah, Tangkak, Muar and Segamat in Johor.

== Notable people ==
People who were born in, residents of, or otherwise closely associated with Nyalas include:

- Ahmad Bin Sulong. Also known as Mat Kelang, a Silat practitioner from Nyalas.
- Zainon Munshi Sulaiman. Also known as Ibu Zain, a teacher and earliest woman politician from UMNO.
- See Kok Luen. A young Football player for Melaka United.

== See also ==
- Jasin District
