= Ayer Kuning =

Mukim in Tampin, Negeri Sembilan, Malaysia

- Mukim
- Interactive map of Ayer Kuning
- Coordinates: 2°30′40″N 102°28′53″E
- Country: Malaysia
- State: Negeri Sembilan
- District: Tampin
- Luak: Ayer Kuning

Government
  - Body: Tampin District Council
  - President: Suriati Salihan
  - MP: Mohd Isam Mohd Isa (BN–UMNO)
  - MLA: Suhaimizan Bizar (BN–UMNO)
- Time zone: UTC+8 (MST)
- Postcode: 73300

Ayer Kuning
- Luak Beradat
- Luak Ayer Kuning
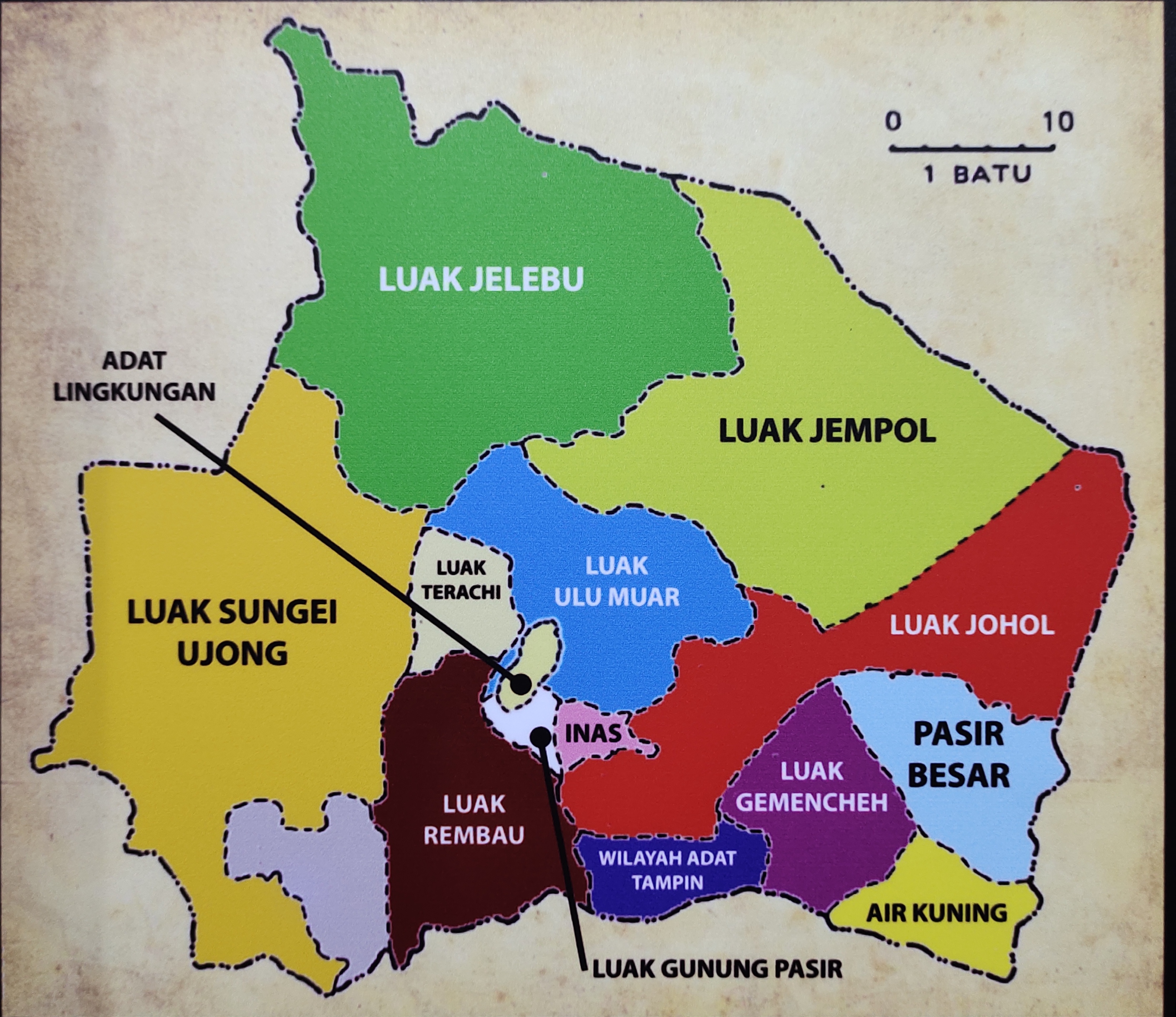
- Luak of Ayer Kuning relative to other luaks in Negeri Sembilan
- Country: Malaysia
- State: Negeri Sembilan
- Adat institution: Undang of Johol

Government
  - Penghulu: Mohamad Ghazali Abdul Jalil

Ayer Kuning in Tampin District

Ayer Kuning is a mukim (township) and village in Tampin District, Negeri Sembilan, Malaysia. It borders Nyalas and Asahan, Malacca to the southwest and south, and Jementah, Johor on the southeast. The largest settlement in Ayer Kuning is Air Kuning Selatan.
