= Johor State Route J154 =

Road in Malaysia

Johor Route 154
- Jalan Kampung Tengah

Major junctions
- Southwest end: Segamat
- FT 1 Federal Route 1 FT 23 Federal Route 23; Segamat Inner Ring Road
- Northeast end: Kampung Tungku Tiga

Location
- Country: Malaysia
- Primary destinations: Kampung Tengah

Highway system
- Highways in Malaysia; Expressways; Federal; State

Johor State Route J154, Jalan Kampung Tengah is a major road in Segamat, Johor, Malaysia.

== Features ==
=== Overlaps ===
- J152/J216/J217 Segamat Inner Ring Road (Laksamana Junctions–Kampung Tengah)

== Junction lists ==
The entire route is located in Segamat District, Johor.

Legend:

- I/C - Interchange, I/S - Intersection, RSA - Rest and service area, OBR - Overhead bridge restaurant, R/R - Restaurant and rest plaza, L/B - Layby, V/P - Vista point, TN - tunnel, T/P - Toll plaza, BR - Bridge
- C - Cloverleaf, S - Stack, T-A - Trumpet-A, T-B - Trumpet-B, DT - Directional-T/Y, SDT - Semi-Directional-T/Y, P-Y - Partial-Y, D - Diamond, P-C - Partial cloverleaf, D-D - Diverging diamond, D-R - Direct ramp

| Location | km | mi | Name | Destinations | Notes |
|---|---|---|---|---|---|
| Segamat | | | Segamat; Permaisuri I/S | Jalan Leong Yong – Segamat town centre FT 1 Malaysia Federal Route 1 – Tampin, Gemas,Bandar Muadzam Shah, Gambang, Kuantan, Labis, Yong Peng; FT 23 Malaysia Federal Route 23 – Jementah, Tangkak, Muar; North–South Expressway Southern Route / AH2 – Kuala Lumpur, Johor Bahru | Junctions |
| Segamat | | | Laksamana I/S | Jalan Aji – Segamat town centre (Bandar Atas); J217 Segamat Inner Ring Road (Jalan Hassan Abdullah) – Genuang, Labis, Yong Peng | Junctions |
| Segamat | | | Laksamana I/S–Kampung Tengah | see also Segamat Inner Ring Road | |
| Kampung Tengah | | | Kampung Tengah | J152 Segamat Inner Ring Road (Jalan Pemuda) – Tampin, Gemas, Kuantan | T-junctions |
| Kampung Tengah | | | Kampung Bukit Lintang | Kampung Bukit Lintang, Kampung Sulir, Taman Sulir | T-junctions |
| Kampung Tengah | | | Sungai Kapeh bridge | | |
| Kampung Tengah | | | Kampung Mengkudu | | |
| Kampung Tengah | | | Kampung Baru Tengah | | |
| Kampung Tengah | | | Kampung Longah | | |
| Kampung Tengah | | | Kampung Tungku Tiga | | End of road |
1.000 mi = 1.609 km; 1.000 km = 0.621 mi: Concurrency terminus
