= Air Kuning Selatan railway station =

Railway station in Tampin, Negeri Sembilan, Malaysia

Coordinates: 2°28′30″N 102°25′09″E

Air Kuning Selatan

General information
- Location: Air Kuning Selatan, Negeri Sembilan; Malaysia
- System: Former KTM Intercity station
- Line: West Coast Line
- Platforms: None
- Tracks: 2

Construction
- Structure type: At-grade

Other information
- Status: Demolished

History
- Opened: 1996
- Closed: 2010
- Original company: Keretapi Tanah Melayu

Former services
| Preceding station | Keretapi Tanah Melayu | Following station |
|---|---|---|
| Batang Melaka towards Padang Besar | North–South Line | Gemas towards Tanjong Pagar |
Location

The Air Kuning Selatan railway station is a Malaysian train station stationed at and named after the town of Air Kuning Selatan, Negeri Sembilan. Prior to the Seremban-Gemas Electrified Double Tracking Project, the station was no longer in operation and was demolished.
