= Kampung Angus =

- Location within Borneo
- Coordinates: 4.08333°N 113.81667°E
- Country: Malaysia
- State: Sarawak
- Administrative Division: Miri
- Elevation: 1 m (3.3 ft)

Kampung Angus is a settlement in the Miri division of Sarawak, Malaysia. It lies approximately 476.8 kilometres (296 mi) northeast of the state capital Kuching.

Neighbouring settlements include:

- Kampung Manjelin 1.8 kilometres (1.1 mi) east
- Kampung Jangalas 2.6 kilometres (1.6 mi) southeast
- Kampung Sasam 2.6 kilometres (1.6 mi) northeast
- Kampung Bungai 2.6 kilometres (1.6 mi) southwest
- Kampung Padang 3.7 kilometres (2.3 mi) east
- Kampung Tengah 3.7 kilometres (2.3 mi) south
- Kampung Lusong 4.1 kilometres (2.5 mi) southeast
- Kampung Kuala Satap 4.1 kilometres (2.5 mi) southeast
- Kampung Satap 4.1 kilometres (2.5 mi) northeast
- Kampung Selanyau 4.1 kilometres (2.5 mi) northeast
