= Jalan Asahan–Jementah =

Malacca and Johor M125 and J277
- Jalan Asahan–Jementah; Asahan–Jementah Road 亚沙汉－利民达路

Route information
- Maintained by Malaysian Public Works Department
- Length: 28.0 km (17.4 mi)
- Existed: 27 February 2013–present
- History: New sections opened on 23 March 2018
- Restrictions: 90 km/h

Major junctions
- Southwest end: Asahan
- M15 Jalan Nyalas; FT 23 Federal Route 23
- Northeast end: Jementah

Location
- Country: Malaysia
- States: Malacca, Negeri Sembilan, Johor
- Primary destinations: Jasin, Nyalas, Simpang Bekoh, Asahan, Jementah, Tangkak, Segamat

Highway system
- Highways in Malaysia; Expressways; Federal; State

Jalan Asahan–Jementah M125/J277 (English: Asahan–Jementah Road; Chinese: 亚沙汉–利民达路), Malacca State Route M125 and Johor State Route J277, is a 28.0-kilometre (17.4 mi) main road in Malaysia, crossing Malacca, Negeri Sembilan and Johor, connecting Asahan and Jementah, opened on 23 March 2018.

== History ==
=== Constructions ===
The Works Ministry of Malaysia announced appropriate RM50.6 million as fee for 17.2-kilometre (10.7 mi) road construction. When the constructions started, some prices of agriculture lands in Jementah increased drastically. The construction started on 27 February 2013.

=== Opening ===
On 23 March 2018, Jalan Asahan–Jementah opened to public. After the opening of the highway, Jementah and Asahan became transportation hubs like Simpang Bekoh. This road also reduces the distances between Asahan and surrounding towns.

=== Pioneer roads ===
The construction of the Jalan Asahan–Jementah included acquiring and upgrading several major roads:

==== Johor side ====
Location	Road
Jementah	Jalan Ah Tong

==== Malacca side ====
Location	Road
Pekan Asahan	M125 Jalan Asahan

== Junction lists ==
State	District	Location	km	mi	Name	Destinations	Notes
Malacca	Jasin	Asahan			Kampung Padang Lebar	M15 Jalan Nyalas – Nyalas, Simpang Bekoh, Jasin, Alor Gajah, Tampin	T-junctions
Malacca	Jasin	Asahan			Nyalas River Bridge		
Malacca	Jasin	Asahan			Kampung Sungai Dua		
Malacca	Jasin	Asahan			Kampung Bukit Asahan		
Malacca	Jasin	Asahan			Asahan		
Malacca	Jasin	Asahan			Bukit Asahan		
Malacca	Jasin	Asahan			Taman Gunung Asahan		
Malacca	Jasin	Asahan			Relau Asahan	Jalan Kampung Raja – Relau Asahan (Johor)	T-junctions
Malacca	Jasin	Asahan			Kampung Relau	Jalan Kampung Relau – Kampung Relau	Sharp T-junctions
Malacca	Jasin	Asahan			Taman Seri Asahan	Shortcut to Military base Alternative route to Federal Route 1	T-junctions
Malacca	Jasin	Asahan			Laman Tiga Budaya Asahan	Laman Tiga Budaya Asahan – Asahan Water Theme Park, Bukit Asahan	T-junctions
Malacca	Jasin	Asahan			Malacca border Arch		
Negeri Sembilan	Tampin	Gemas			Length: 800 m		
Negeri Sembilan–Johor border					Gemas River Bridge		
Johor	Tangkak	GSA Gemeh			Johor border Arch		
Johor	Tangkak	GSA Gemeh			Kampung Kenangan Gemeh		
Johor	Segamat	Jementah			Kampung Bukit Kledang		
Johor	Segamat	Jementah			Ladang Welch		
Johor	Segamat	Jementah			Jementah River Bridge		
Johor	Segamat	Jementah			Jementah	FT 23 Malaysia Federal Route 23 – Segamat, Labis, Yong Peng, Johor Bahru, Kuantan, Mount Ledang, Tangkak, Muar; North–South Expressway Southern Route / AH2 – Kuala Lumpur, Seremban, Malacca, Yong Peng, Ayer Hitam, Simpang Renggam, Kulai, Johor Bahru, Singapore; Jalan Padang – Kampung Baru Jementah	Junctions
1.000 mi = 1.609 km; 1.000 km = 0.621 mi

== Trivia ==
Due to the lack of publication, many people does not know the road already open to public.
