= Kampung Jangalas =

- Location within Borneo
- Coordinates: 4.06667°N 113.83333°E
- Country: Malaysia
- State: Sarawak
- Administrative Division: Miri
- Elevation: 1 m (3.3 ft)

Kampung Jangalas is a settlement in the Miri division of Sarawak, Malaysia. It lies approximately 477.2 kilometres (297 mi) northeast of the state capital Kuching.

Neighbouring settlements include:

- Kampung Lusong 1.9 kilometres (1.2 mi) east
- Kampung Kuala Satap 1.9 kilometres (1.2 mi) east
- Kampung Manjelin 1.9 kilometres (1.2 mi) north
- Kampung Angus 2.6 kilometres (1.6 mi) northwest
- Kampung Padang 2.6 kilometres (1.6 mi) northeast
- Kampung Tengah 2.6 kilometres (1.6 mi) southwest
- Bekenu 2.6 kilometres (1.6 mi) southeast
- Kampung Bungai 3.7 kilometres (2.3 mi) west
- Kampung Ajau 3.7 kilometres (2.3 mi) east
- Kampung Sasam 3.7 kilometres (2.3 mi) north
