= Jalan Bekoh =

Road in Malaysia

Malacca and Johor State Route M123 and J123
- Jalan Bekoh

Major junctions
- North end: Simpang Bekoh
- M15 Jalan Nyalas; FT 23 Federal Route 23
- South end: Kampung Payamas, Tangkak

Location
- Country: Malaysia
- Primary destinations: Simpang Bekoh

Highway system
- Highways in Malaysia; Expressways; Federal; State

Jalan Bekoh (Malacca State Route M123/Johor State Route J123) is a major road in Malacca and Johor state, Malaysia.

== Background ==
=== Alternative route ===
Jalan Bekoh became one of the alternative route between Tangkak to Segamat to repair bridge in Malaysia Federal Route 23 coded FT023/038/10 near to the Mount Ledang junctions.

=== Issues ===
Since the opening of M125/J277 Jalan Asahan–Jementah, Simpang Bekoh become one of the transport basement in Malacca–Johor Border. The T-junctions for Simpang Bekoh side is narrow and become straight corner. In the same time there is lack of the traffic light at there, leading to risk of accidents in Simpang Bekoh.

== History ==
In 2021, the traffic light at Kampung Payamas, Tangkak is built.

== Features ==
=== Alternative routes ===
- M125/J277 Jalan Asahan–Jementah – Between Simpang Bekoh and Jementah/Segamat

== Junction lists ==
Legend:

- I/C - Interchange, I/S - Intersection, RSA - Rest and service area, OBR - Overhead bridge restaurant, R/R - Restaurant and rest plaza, L/B - Layby, V/P - Vista point, TN - tunnel, T/P - Toll plaza, BR - Bridge
- C - Cloverleaf, S - Stack, T-A - Trumpet-A, T-B - Trumpet-B, DT - Directional-T/Y, SDT - Semi-Directional-T/Y, P-Y - Partial-Y, D - Diamond, P-C - Partial cloverleaf, D-D - Diverging diamond, D-R - Direct ramp

State	District	Location	km	mi	Name	Destinations	Notes
Malacca	Jasin	Simpang Bekoh			Simpang Bekoh	M15 Jalan Nyalas – Nyalas, Ayer Kuning Selatan, Chin-Chin, Jasin, Malacca	T-junctions
Malacca-Johor border					Kesang River bridge		
Johor	Tangkak	Bekoh			Kampung Bekoh		T-junctions
Johor	Tangkak	Bekoh			Kampung Baru Bekoh		
Johor	Tangkak	Kampung Dok			Kampung Dok		
Johor	Tangkak	Kampung Chenas			Kampung Chenas		
Johor	Tangkak	Kampung Payamas			Jalan Manja	Jalan Manja	T-junctions
Johor	Tangkak	Kampung Payamas			Kampung Payamas	FT 23 Jalan Payamas – Tangkak, Muar, Jementah, Segamat; North–South Expressway Southern Route / AH2 – Kuala Lumpur, Johor Bahru	T-junctions
1.000 mi = 1.609 km; 1.000 km = 0.621 mi
