= Malaysia Federal Route 1384 =

Road in Malaysia

Federal Route 1384
- Jalan Medoi

Route information
- Maintained by Malaysian Public Works Department

Major junctions
- Northeast end: FELDA Medoi
- Segamat Inner Ring Road
- Southwest end: Segamat

Location
- Country: Malaysia
- Primary destinations: Kampung Jawa

Highway system
- Highways in Malaysia; Expressways; Federal; State

Jalan Medoi, Federal Route 1384 (formerly Johor State Route J152), is a federal road in Segamat, Johor, Malaysia.

At most sections, the Federal Route 1384 was built under the JKR R5 road standard, with a speed limit of 90 km/h.

== Junction lists ==
The entire route is located in Segamat District, Johor.

Legend:

- I/C - Interchange, I/S - Intersection, RSA - Rest and service area, OBR - Overhead bridge restaurant, R/R - Restaurant and rest plaza, L/B - Layby, V/P - Vista point, TN - tunnel, T/P - Toll plaza, BR - Bridge
- C - Cloverleaf, S - Stack, T-A - Trumpet-A, T-B - Trumpet-B, DT - Directional-T/Y, SDT - Semi-Directional-T/Y, P-Y - Partial-Y, D - Diamond, P-C - Partial cloverleaf, D-D - Diverging diamond, D-R - Direct ramp

Location	km	mi	Name	Destinations	Notes
Segamat			Segamat; Segamat Inner Ring Road	Segamat Inner Ring Road – Segamat town centre, Tampin, Gemas, Kuantan, Genuang, Labis, Yong Peng, Johor Bahru	T-junctions
Segamat			Kampung Jawa		
Segamat			Taman Tasik		
Segamat			Kampung Jawa	J38 Jalan Maryani – Taman Seri Waja, Taman Jenalim, Kampung Abdullah	T-junctions
Segamat			Kampung Padang Lalang		
Segamat			Taman Mega		
Segamat			Shariff Motocross Circuit		
Segamat			FELDA Medoi		
1.000 mi = 1.609 km; 1.000 km = 0.621 mi
