= Bekenu =

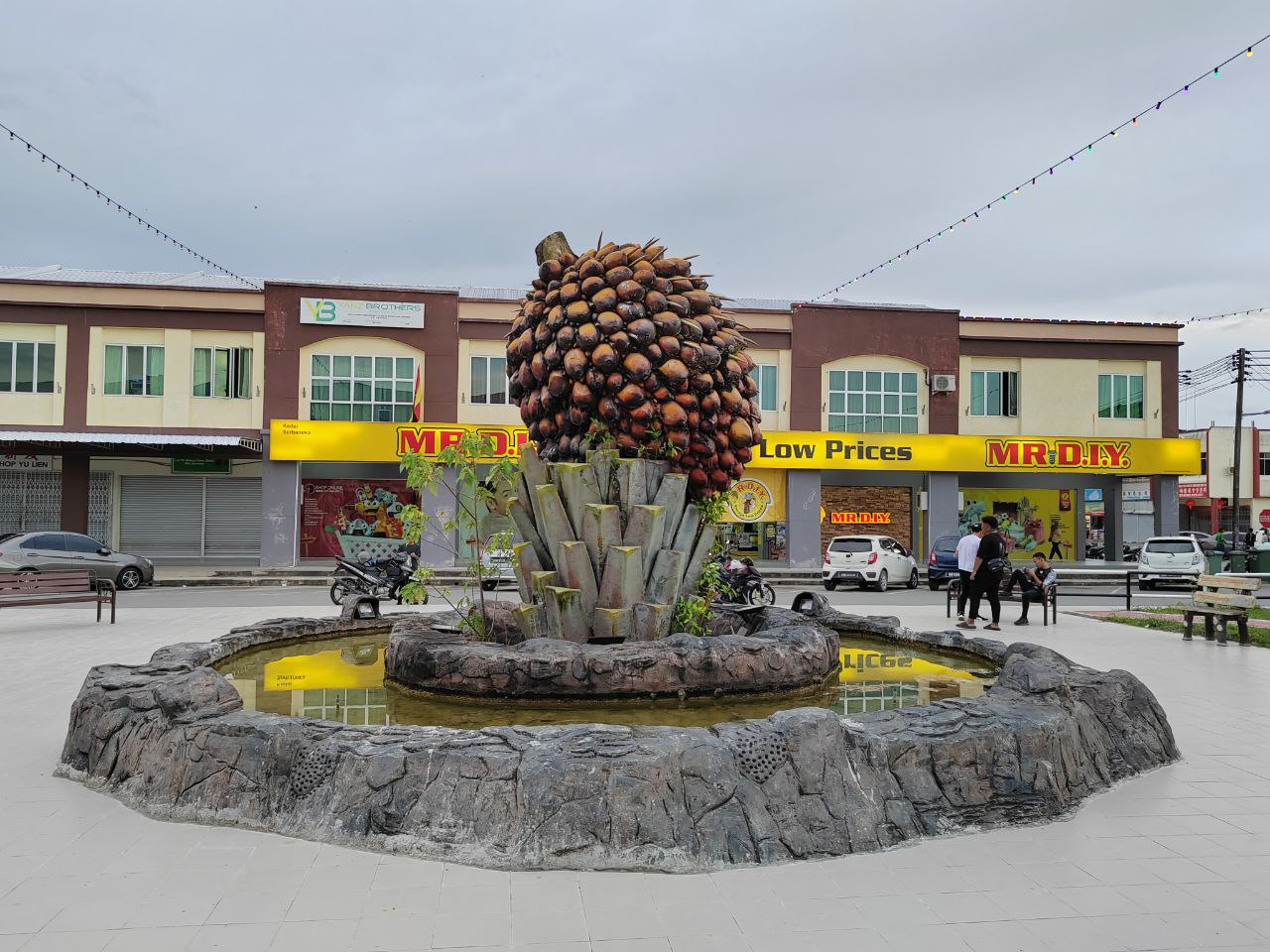

- Location within Borneo
- Coordinates: 4.05°N 113.85°E
- Country: Malaysia
- State: Sarawak
- Elevation: 10 m (33 ft)

Bekenu (also known as Bekenu Bazaar or Bakenu) is a small fishing town near Miri, in Sarawak, Malaysia. Bekenu bazaar is the capital of the Sibuti subdistrict, Subis district, Miri Division.

== Etymology ==
Oil palm branch is the symbol of Bekenu town.

== History ==
Along with parts of present Sarawak, Bekenu was a territory under the jurisdiction of the Brunei Empire from the 12th century until 1883, when the people in Bekenu rebelled against Brunei Empire and the rebellion cause the Sultan of Brunei (Sultan Abdul Momin) to ceded the Baram region (including Bekenu) to Charles Brooke.

== Administration ==
Subis district council administers the Subis district, which consists of two subdistricts, namely Sibuti subdistrict and Niah-Suai subdistrict. The council is located within the Bekenu bazaar.

== Geography ==
Bekenu experienced floods in February 1966, January 1967, January 1972, January 1981, June 2020, October 2021, October 2022, and January 2023.

The most serious flood in Bekenu was in 1962 when shops were flooded up to the first floor and people had to be rescued by fishermen in rowing boats.

== Town and villages ==
Neighbouring settlements include:

- Kampung Kuala Satap 1.9 kilometres (1.2 mi) north
- Kampung Lusong 1.9 kilometres (1.2 mi) north
- Kampung Jangalas 2.6 kilometres (1.6 mi) northwest
- Kampung Ajau 2.6 kilometres (1.6 mi) northeast
- Kampung Tengah 3.7 kilometres (2.3 mi) west
- Kampung Sinop 3.7 kilometres (2.3 mi) east
- Kampung Padang 3.7 kilometres (2.3 mi) north
- Kampung Sungi Tiris 3.7 kilometres (2.3 mi) south
- Kampung Teris 4.1 kilometres (2.5 mi) southwest

== Economy ==
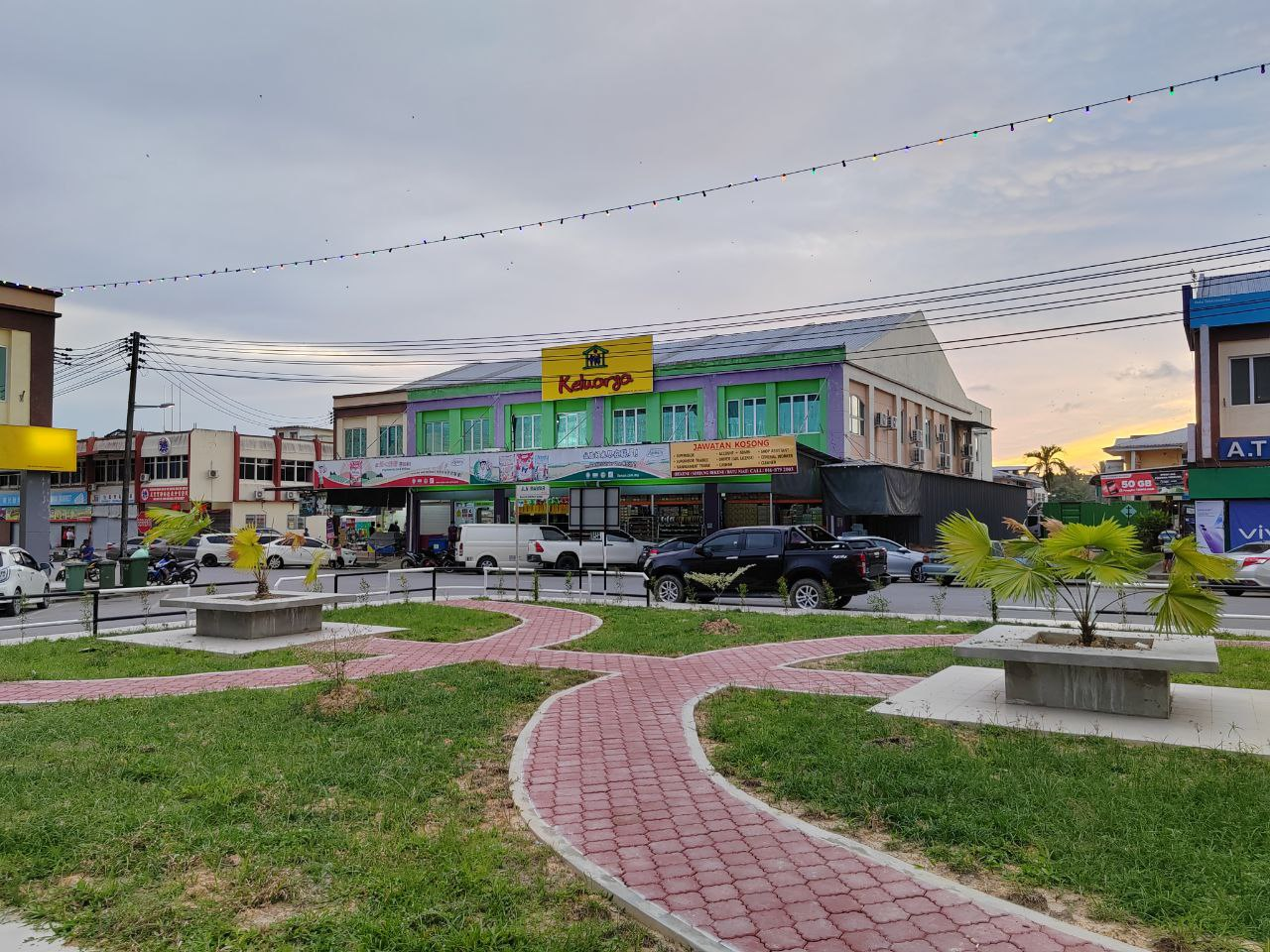
Shophouses in the Bekenu town.

Bekenu is known as the "fruit belt" for the city of Miri. There is a coconut plantation at "Rancha Rancha" and a herb plantation at Kampung Terahad. Examples of herbs that are planted are lemon grass, ginger, turmeric, shallots, and chilies.

Shophouses in Bekenu town conduct various businesses such as coffee shops and selling groceries, food, and farming equipment.

== Attractions and recreational spots ==
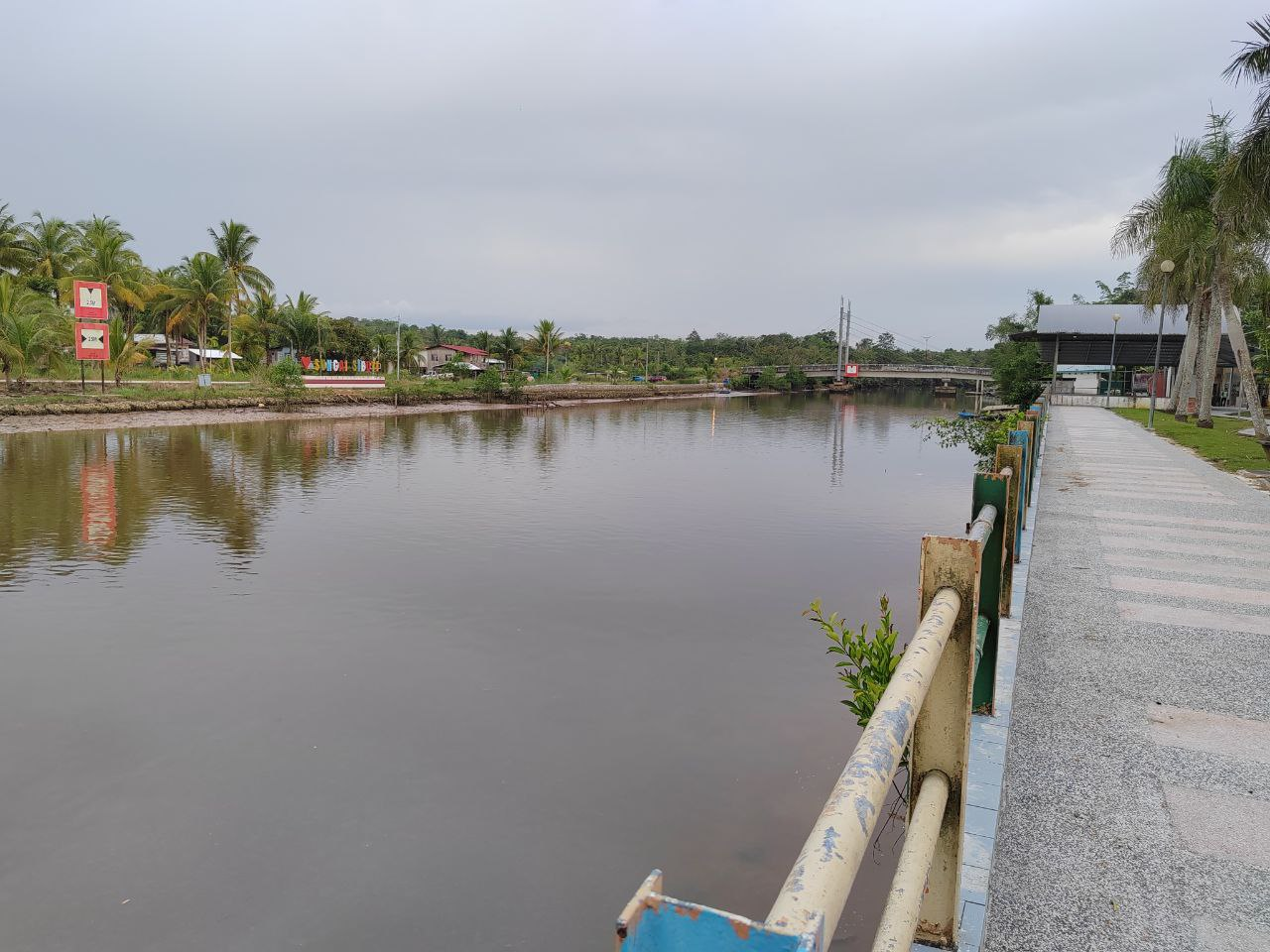
Bekenu Esplanade park near the Sibuti river.

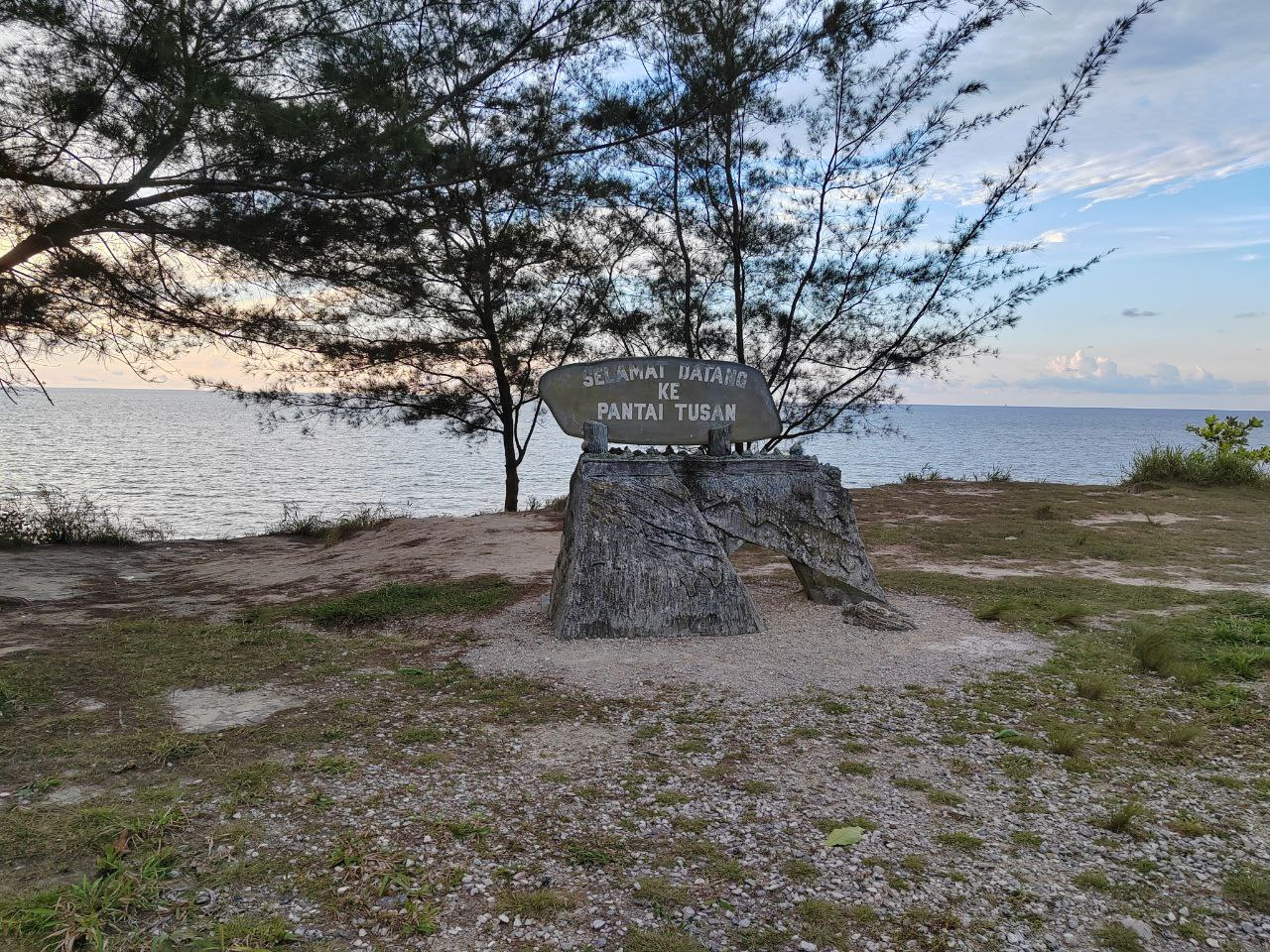
Tusan beach signage.

The town has a central market and a riverbank esplanade park. The town square faces the Bekenu river, and many of the shophouses date from the 1930s.

Tusan Beach is located nearby the town. Since 2015, the "Blue Tears" phenomenon caused by Dinoflagellate bioluminescence can be seen at Tusan beach. The iconic rock formation that resembles "horse head drinking water" was collapsed in 2020. Other rock formations at the beach are "Lion head" and "Baby Drinking Horse Head".
