= Saujana Asahan =

Sports and recreational centre in Jasin, Malacca, Malaysia

Coordinates: 2°24′24.0″N 102°34′55.0″E

Saujana Asahan National Sports Council Complex
- Kompleks Majlis Sukan Negara Saujana Asahan
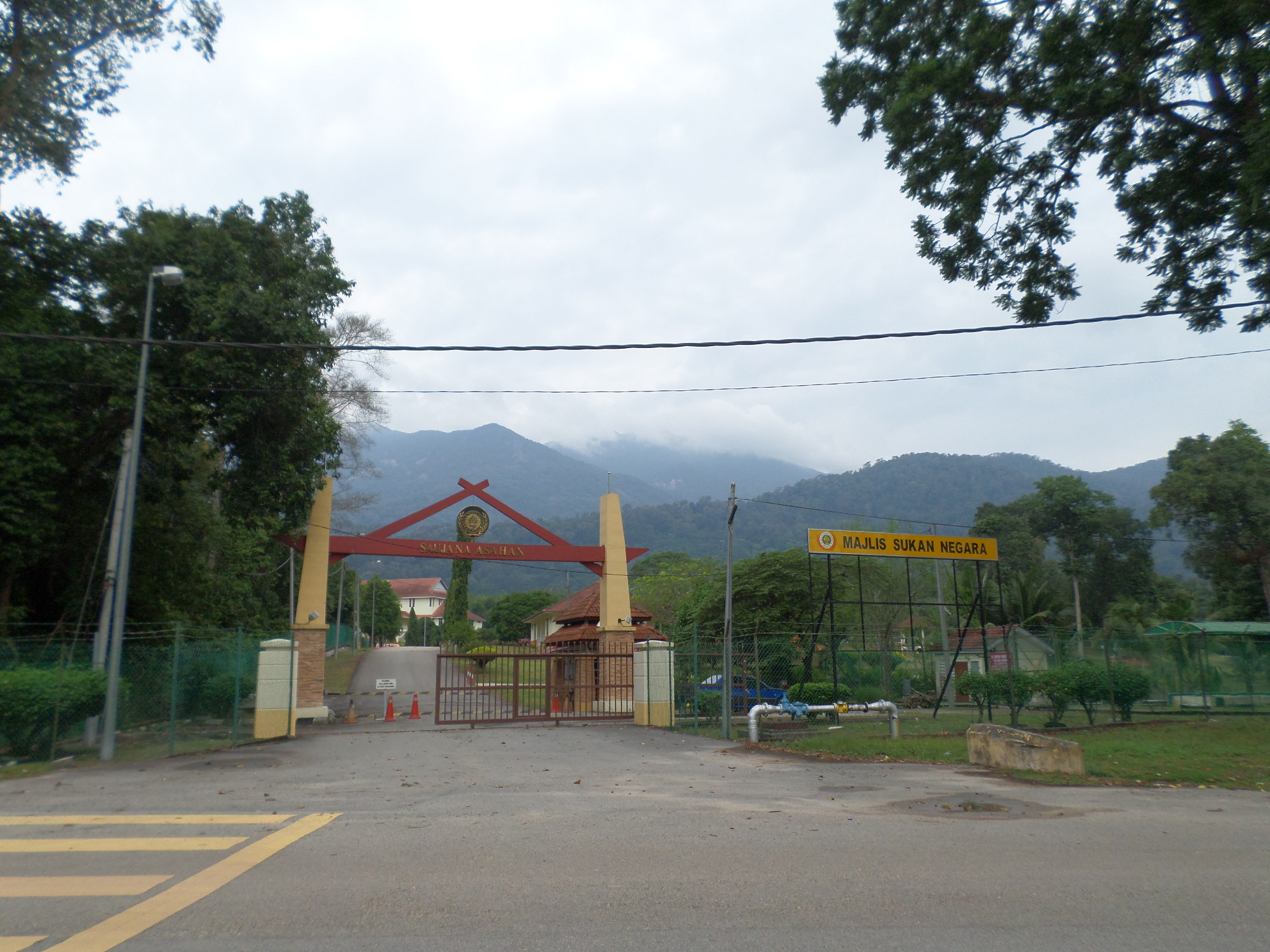
- Interactive map of the Saujana Asahan National Sports Council Complex area

General information
- Location: Asahan, Jasin, Malacca, Malaysia
- Construction started: 8 November 2000
- Completed: 8 February 2002
- Owner: National Sports Council of Malaysia
- Management: National Sports Council of Malaysia

Website
- www.nsc.gov.my

Saujana Asahan National Sports Council Complex (Malay: Kompleks Majlis Sukan Negara Saujana Asahan) is a sports and recreation centre located in the town of Pekan Asahan in Jasin District in the Malaysian state of Malacca owned by the National Sports Council of Malaysia (NSC). It began construction on 8 November 2000 and completed on 8 February 2002. The centre was built to organise motivational and team building programmes, Seminars and Indoor and Outdoor activities.

== Accommodations ==
Six types of accommodations are available at the premises:

- VIP House
- Cluster House
- Double Room
- Dormitory
- Chalet
- Camp Site

== Facilities ==
- Grand Hall
- 5 Lecture Rooms
- Football Field

== See also ==
- Ministry of Youth and Sports (Malaysia)
  - National Sports Council of Malaysia
- Pekan Asahan
