= Kampung Manjelin =

Kampung Menjelin
- Location within Borneo
- Coordinates: 4.078°N 113.838°E
- Country: Malaysia
- State: Sarawak
- Administrative Division: Miri
- Elevation: 1 m (3.3 ft)

Kampung Menjelin is a settlement in the Miri division of Sarawak, Malaysia. It lies approximately 478.3 kilometres (297 mi) northeast of the state capital Kuching.

Neighbouring settlements include:

- Kampung Angus 1.8 kilometres (1.1 mi) west
- Kampung Padang 1.9 kilometres (1.2 mi) east
- Kampung Jangalas 1.9 kilometres (1.2 mi) south
- Kampung Sasam 1.9 kilometres (1.2 mi) north
- Kampung Lusong 2.6 kilometres (1.6 mi) southeast
- Kampung Kuala Satap 2.6 kilometres (1.6 mi) southeast
- Kampung Satap 2.6 kilometres (1.6 mi) northeast
- Kampung Selanyau 2.6 kilometres (1.6 mi) northeast
- Kampung Satap 3.7 kilometres (2.3 mi) east
- Kampung Bakong 3.7 kilometres (2.3 mi) north
