= Segamat River =

River of Johor, Malaysia

Coordinates: 2°30′44.8″N 102°49′29.3″E

- Native name: Sungai Segamat (Malay)

Location
- Country: Johor, Malaysia

Physical characteristics
- Source
  - location: Gunung Besar, Labis, Johor
- Mouth
  - location: Kampung Tebing Tinggi, Johor

The Segamat River (Malay: Sungai Segamat) is a river which flows within the District of Segamat, Johor, Malaysia which also flows through Segamat town center. The source of the river is at Gunung Besar which is located within Endau Rompin National Park and its confluence is at the Muar River.

== History ==
The Segamat River was discovered by Bendahara Tepok and his troops while fleeing after the Sultanate of Malacca was conquered by the Portuguese troops led by Afonso de Albuquerque in 1511. The Bendahara took a rest at an area by the river and drank the water there. He reportedly exclaimed, "Segar amat!" (Very Refreshing), thus the river got its name.

Then, the Bendahara and his troops established the settlement called Rantau Panjang which later became Segamat town center. Since then, the river became the main transportation between Rantau Panjang and Muar until the advent of the national railway system and the road system (Federal Route 1 and Federal Route 23) by the British colonial government. Since then, the river was no longer used as an important transportation.

== Bridgings ==
The river is bridged by three bridges in Segamat town.

== Flood-prone areas along the river ==
- Kampung Tungku Tiga
- Kampung Tengah
- Segamat town center (Bandar Seberang)
- Kampung Lubuk Batu
- Kampung Gemereh
- Kampung Batu Badak

== See also ==
- Geography of Malaysia
