= Kampung Sasam =

- Location within Borneo
- Coordinates: 4.1°N 113.83333°E
- Country: Malaysia
- State: Sarawak
- Administrative Division: Miri
- Elevation: 1 m (3.3 ft)

Kampung Sasam is a settlement in the Miri division of Sarawak, Malaysia. It lies approximately 479.3 kilometres (298 mi) northeast of the state capital Kuching.

Neighbouring settlements include:

- Kampung Satap 1.9 kilometres (1.2 mi) east
- Kampung Selanyau 1.9 kilometres (1.2 mi) east
- Kampung Manjelin 1.9 kilometres (1.2 mi) south
- Kampung Tusan 1.9 kilometres (1.2 mi) north
- Kampung Bakong 1.9 kilometres (1.2 mi) north
- Kampung Angus 2.6 kilometres (1.6 mi) southwest
- Kampung Padang 2.6 kilometres (1.6 mi) southeast
- Kampung Sungai Rait 3.7 kilometres (2.3 mi) east
- Kampung Jangalas 3.7 kilometres (2.3 mi) south
- Kampung Opak 4.1 kilometres (2.5 mi) northeast
