= National Sports Council of Malaysia =

Government agency in Malaysia

National Sports Council of Malaysia (NSC)
- Majlis Sukan Negara Malaysia (MSN)
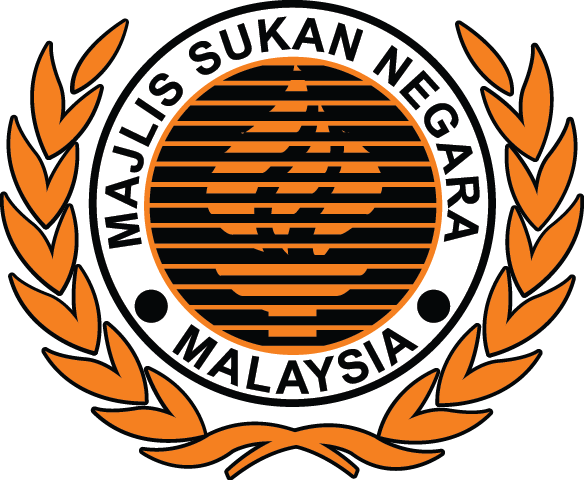

Agency overview
- Formed: February 21, 1972; 54 years ago
- Jurisdiction: Government of Malaysia
- Headquarters: National Sports Complex, Jalan Barat, Bukit Jalil, 57000 Kuala Lumpur, Malaysia
- Minister responsible: Hannah Yeoh, Minister of Youth and Sports
- Deputy Minister responsible: Adam Adli, Deputy Minister of Youth and Sports
- Agency executive: Ahmad Shapawi Ismail, Director General
- Parent department: Ministry of Youth and Sports
- Key documents: NSC Act 1971; NSC Act 1979 Amendment
- Website: www.nsc.gov.my

The National Sports Council of Malaysia (Malay: Majlis Sukan Negara Malaysia, NSC or MSN), is a government agency and statutory body under the Ministry of Youth and Sports of the Government of Malaysia which governs the sporting activities in Malaysia. It was established under National Sports Council of Malaysia Act 1971 (amended in 1979) and launched by the second Prime Minister of Malaysia, Abdul Razak Hussein on 21 February 1972.

== List of programmes ==
- Athletes Training Programme
- Para Athletes Training Programme
- National Football Development Programme
- FAM-MSN Project
- National Hockey Development Programme
- National Netball Development Programme
- National Rugby Development Programme
- Junior Cycling Malaysia
- Women in Sports

== List of venues ==
Name	Location	Ref
Bukit Jalil National Sports Council Complex (Headquarters)	KL Sports City, Bukit Jalil, Kuala Lumpur	
Malaysia Paralympic Sports Excellence Centre	Kampung Pandan, Kuala Lumpur	
Saujana Asahan National Sports Council Complex	Asahan, Jasin District, Malacca	
Pagoh National Sports Council Complex	Pagoh, Muar District, Johor	
Kuala Rompin National Sports Council Complex	Kuala Rompin, Rompin District, Pahang	
National Sailing Training Centre	Langkawi, Kedah	
Dungun National Sports Council Complex	Dungun District, Terengganu	
National Velodrome of Malaysia	Nilai, Seremban District, Negeri Sembilan	
Mokhtar Dahari National Football Academy	Gambang, Kuantan District, Pahang	
Setiawangsa Sports Complex	Wangsa Maju, Kuala Lumpur	

=== Former venues ===
- Taman Keramat National Sports Council Complex - Handed over to SkySierra Development Sdn Bhd for the development of The Valley Residence Modern Housing Project.

== Affiliated federal territories and state sports councils ==
Section 7 of the National Sports Council of Malaysia Act 1971 empowers the Government to establish Sports Councils in the Federal Territories and each state of Malaysia. While the Sports Councils of the Peninsular states are administered by the Secretary Office of the respective State Government, the Sabah and Sarawak State Sports Councils are administered by the Ministry of Youth and Sports of the respective state and the Federal Territories Sports Council is administered by the Department of Federal Territories.

Name	Sports Council	Ref
Federal Territories	Federal Territories Sports Council	
Johor	Johor State Sports Council	
Kedah	Kedah State Sports Council	
Kelantan	Kelantan State Sports Council	
Malacca	Malacca State Sports Council	
Negeri Sembilan	Negeri Sembilan State Sports Council	
Pahang	Pahang State Sports Council	
Penang	Penang State Sports Council	
Perak	Perak State Sports Council	
Perlis	Perlis State Sports Council	
Sabah	Sabah State Sports Council	
Sarawak	Sarawak State Sports Council	
Selangor	Selangor State Sports Council	
Terengganu	Terengganu State Sports Council	

== Awards ==
- Anugerah Sukan Negara
