= Asahan (town) =

Town in Jasin, Malacca, Malaysia

- Suburb
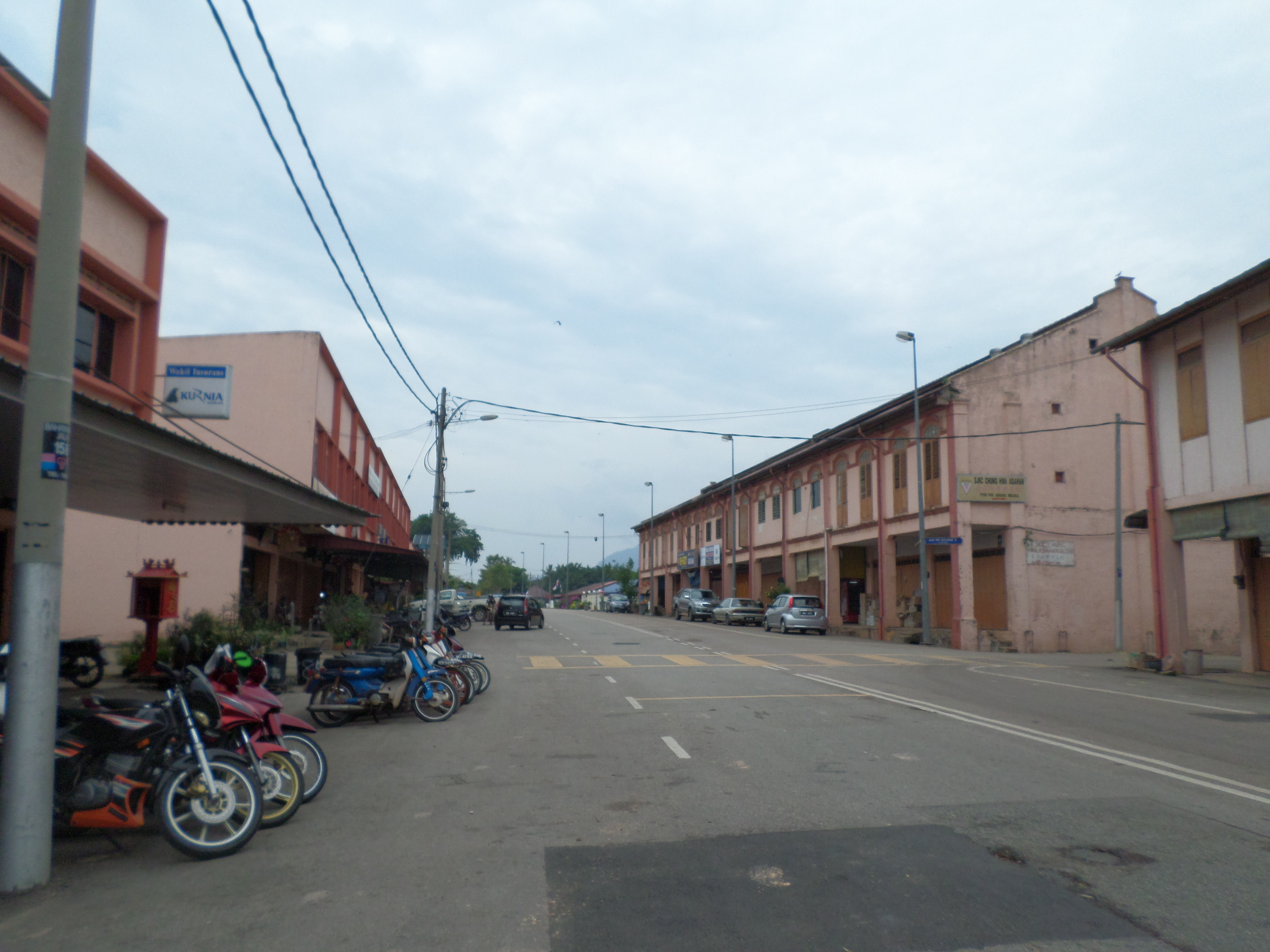
- Shophouses along Jalan Besar Asahan, the main road of the town.
- Interactive map of Asahan
- Coordinates: 2°23′33″N 102°32′41″E
- Country: Malaysia
- State: Malacca
- Town: Jasin
- District: Jasin

Area
  - Total: 0.1072 km^{2} (0.0414 sq mi)

Population (2020)
  - Total: 87
  - Density: 810/km^{2} (2,100/sq mi)
- Time zone: UTC+8 (MST)
  - Summer (DST): Not observed
- Website: www.mpjasin.gov.my

Asahan is a small town in Jasin District in the Malaysian state of Malacca. It is located near the state border tripoint with Johor and Negeri Sembilan at the foot of Mount Ledang, and wedged between Chabau Mukim and neighbouring Tangkak District of Johor, with the main road Jalan Besar cuts through the entire town.

The town consists of villages and residential areas like Kampung Bukit Asahan, Taman Gunung Asahan, Kampung Relau and Taman Seri Asahan as well as shophouses in the town centre that provide basic amenities to local residents.

== Education ==
- Asahan National Primary School
- Chung Hwa Asahan National Type Chinese Primary School
- Ladang Bukit Asahan Tamil Primary School
- St Mary Kindergarten

== Religious sites ==
- Al-Bulkhari Kariah Mosque
- Asahan Chinese Methodist Church (Protestant Church)
- Tun Khalil Mosque
- Kuil Sri Maha Mariamman Temple

== Tourist attractions ==
- Asahan Waterfall, at the northern foot of Mount Ledang
- Laman Tiga Budaya (Site of the Three Cultures) - A recreational area with a monument marking the tripoint between the states of Johor, Malacca and Negeri Sembilan and a water theme park.
- Saujana Asahan - Sports and recreation centre owned by the National Sports Council of Malaysia.

== Transport ==
=== Land ===
- M125/J277 Jalan Asahan–Jementah – Main route to Simpang Bekoh, Kampung Relau and Jementah, to Tangkak, Muar and Segamat in Johor through Federal Route 23, crossing through this town.

== Gallery ==
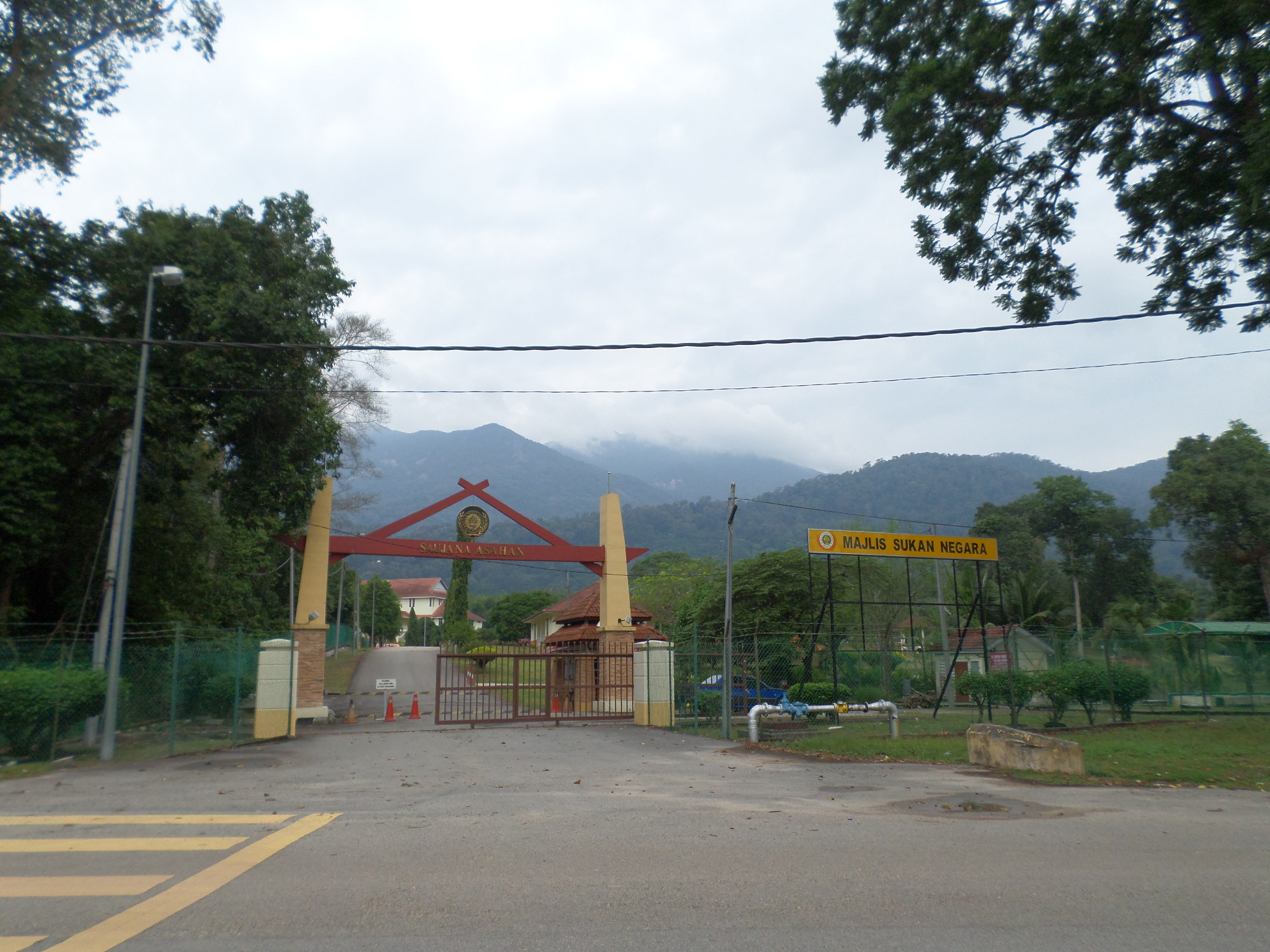
Saujana Asahan, with Mount Ledang rising in the background

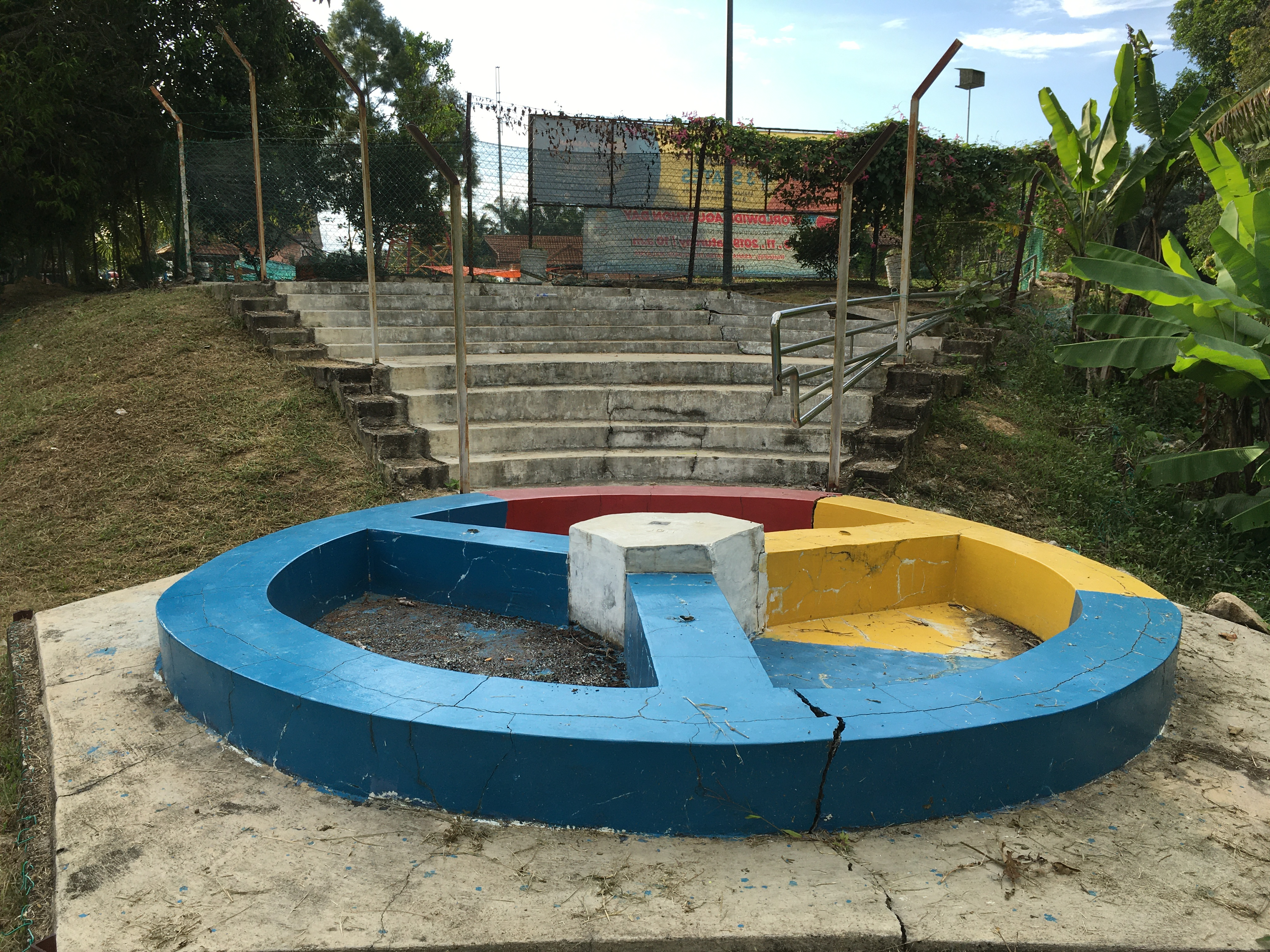
A monument in Laman Tiga Budaya, marking the tripoint between the states of Malacca (red), Negeri Sembilan (yellow) and Johor (blue), with the water theme park in the background.

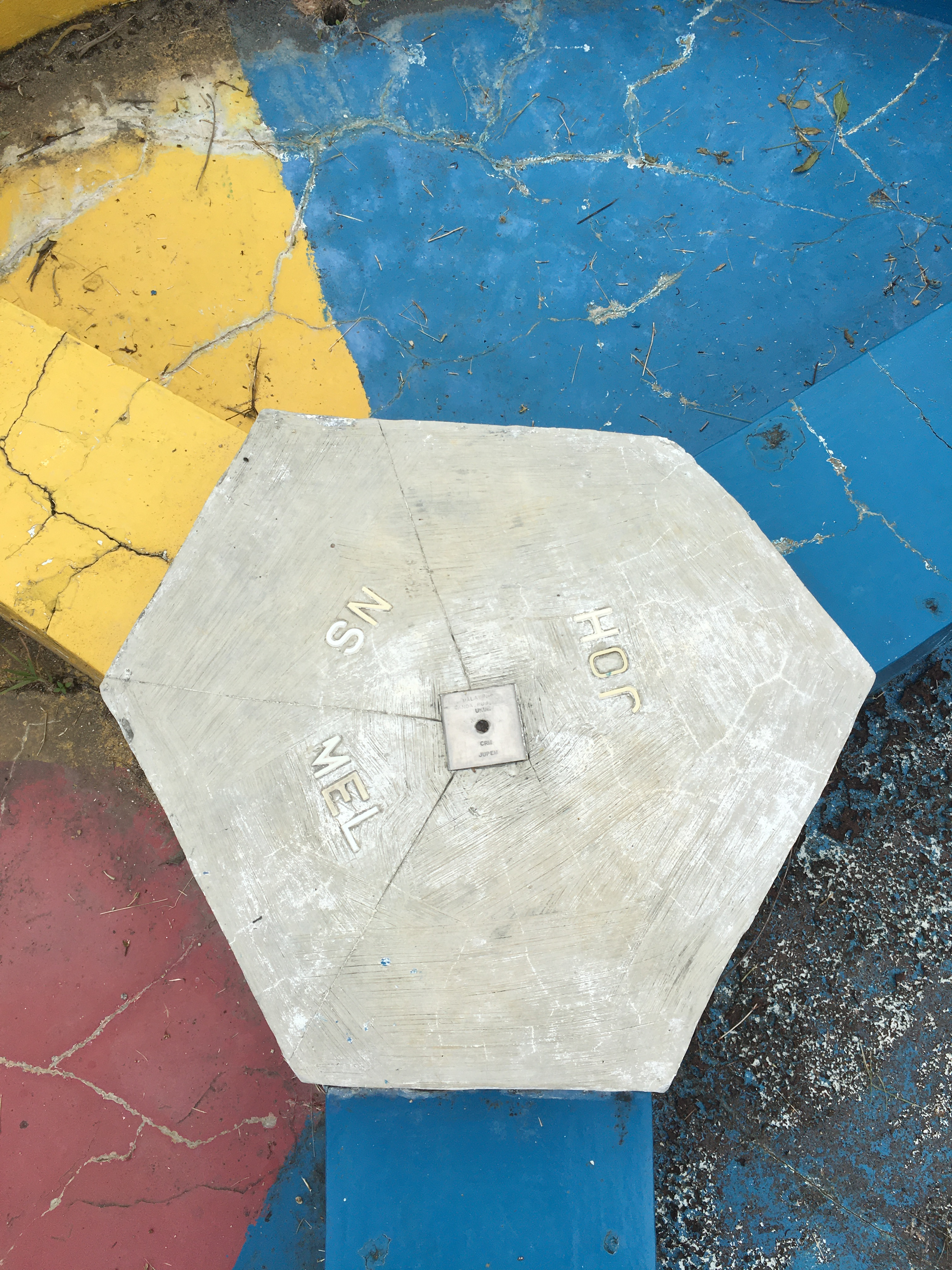
Closeup of the monument.

== See also ==
- Jasin District
