= Air Kuning Selatan =

- Town
- Location within Negeri Sembilan Location within Peninsular Malaysia Location within Malaysia
- Coordinates: 2°30′40″N 102°28′53″E
- Country: Malaysia
- State: Negeri Sembilan
- District: Tampin
- Luak: Ayer Kuning

Government
  - Body: Tampin District Council
  - President: Suriati Salihan
  - MP: Mohd Isam Mohd Isa (BN–UMNO)
  - MLA: Suhaimizan Bizar (BN–UMNO)
- Time zone: UTC+8 (MST)
- Postcode: 73300

Air Kuning Selatan in Tampin District

Air Kuning Selatan is a small town in Tampin District, Negeri Sembilan in Malaysia.

== List of townships ==
1. Taman Sungai Dua
2. Kampung Sungai Dua
3. Felda Bukit Jalor
4. Kampung Baru
5. Taman Sri
6. Taman Kompleks Sukan
7. Taman Semarak
8. Taman Semarak 2
9. Taman Air Kuning Selatan
10. Kampung Parit Buloh
11. Kampung Tengah
12. Kampung Paya Lebar
13. Kampung Ulu
14. Kampung Punggor

== Education ==
=== Primary schools ===
1. SJK(C) Air Kuning
2. SK Air Kuning
3. SJK(T) Air Kuning
4. SJK(C) Bukit Kledek
5. SJK(T) Bukit Kledek
6. SK Bukit Jalor
7. SK(A)Mahad Ahmadi

=== Secondary schools ===
1. SMK (Felda) Bukit Jalor Zon Air Kuning Selatan
2. Maktab Rendah Sains Mara (MRSM) Sg. Dua
3. Mahad Ahmaddi
4. SMK Dato'Taha
