= Kampung Tengah =

Coordinates: 2°31′33.4″N 102°48′35.1″E

- Town and Village
- Location in Malaysia
- Country: Malaysia
- State: Johor
- District: Segamat

Kampung Tengah is a small town and village in Segamat District, Johor, Malaysia. Kampung Tengah is divided into two main settlements - the Malay village side and the Chinese New Village - where both settlements are separated by Sungai Kapeh.

While the village was initially established by Malay settlers, the Chinese New Village side was established by the British as a part of Briggs Plan during the Malayan Emergency. At that time, the small town was nicknamed as "50 Ekar" (50 Acres) due to the total area width of the New Village.
