= Segamat (town) =

Town in Johor, Malaysia

- Town and district capital
- Segamat Town; Bandar Segamat
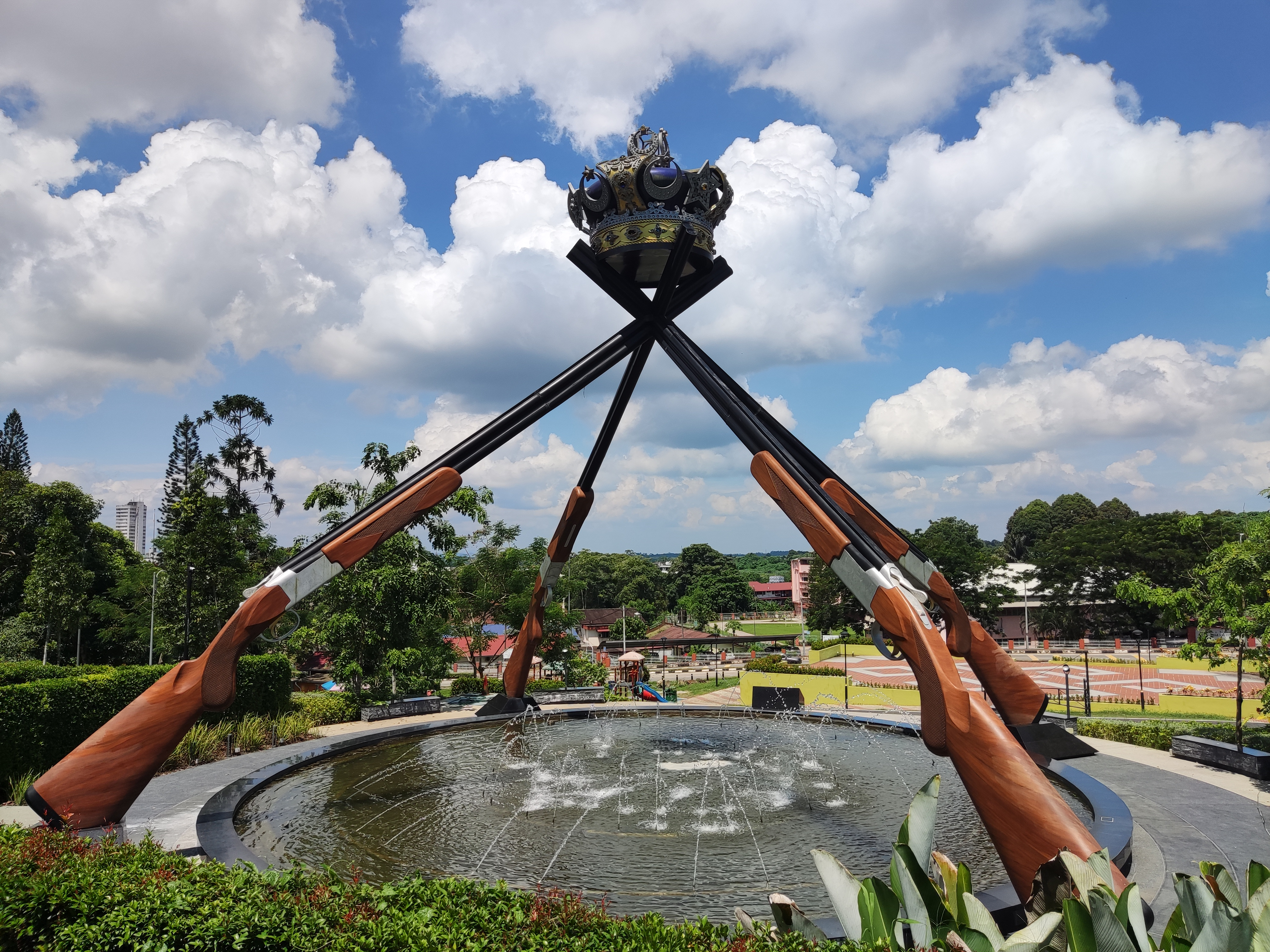
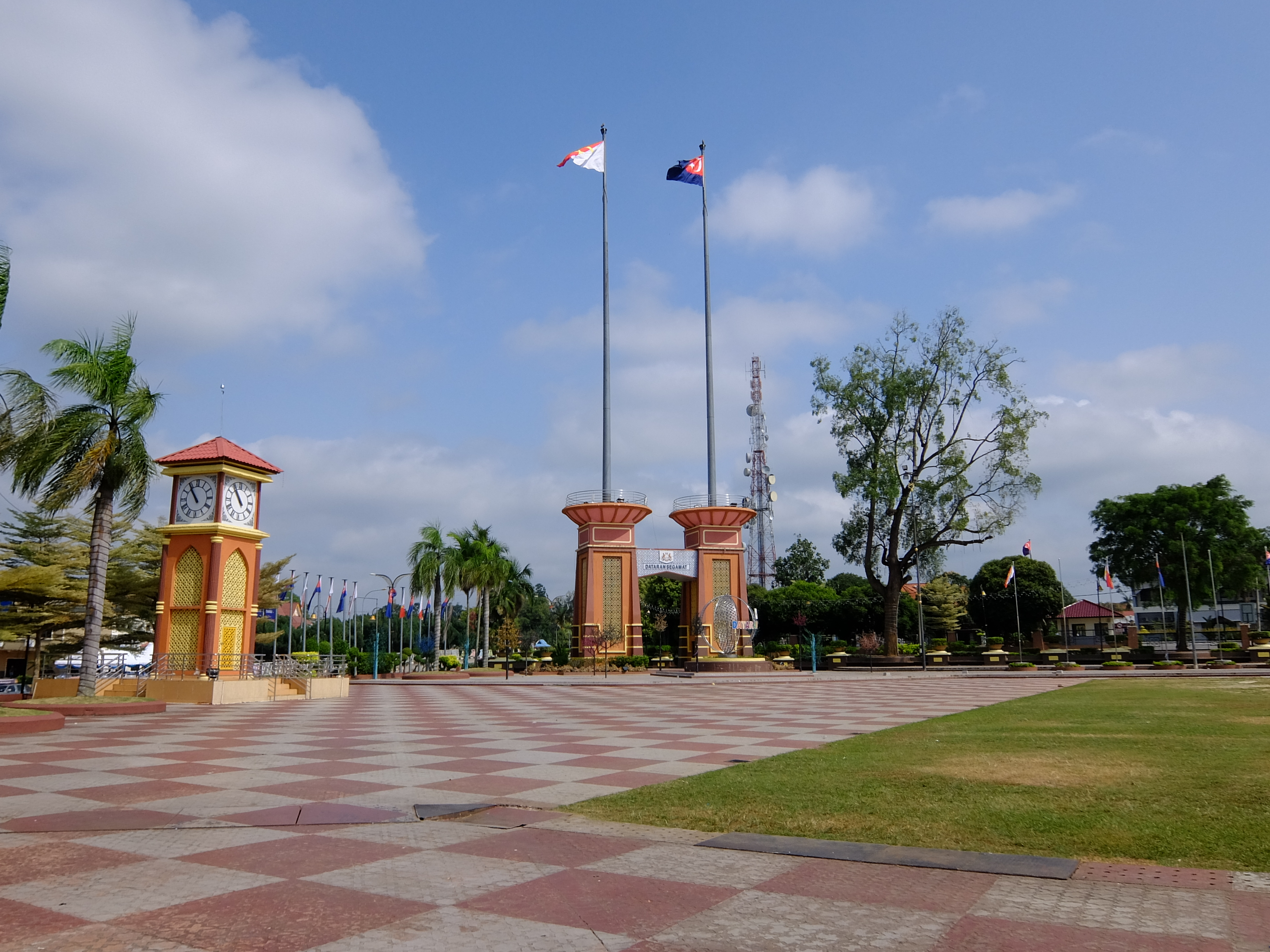
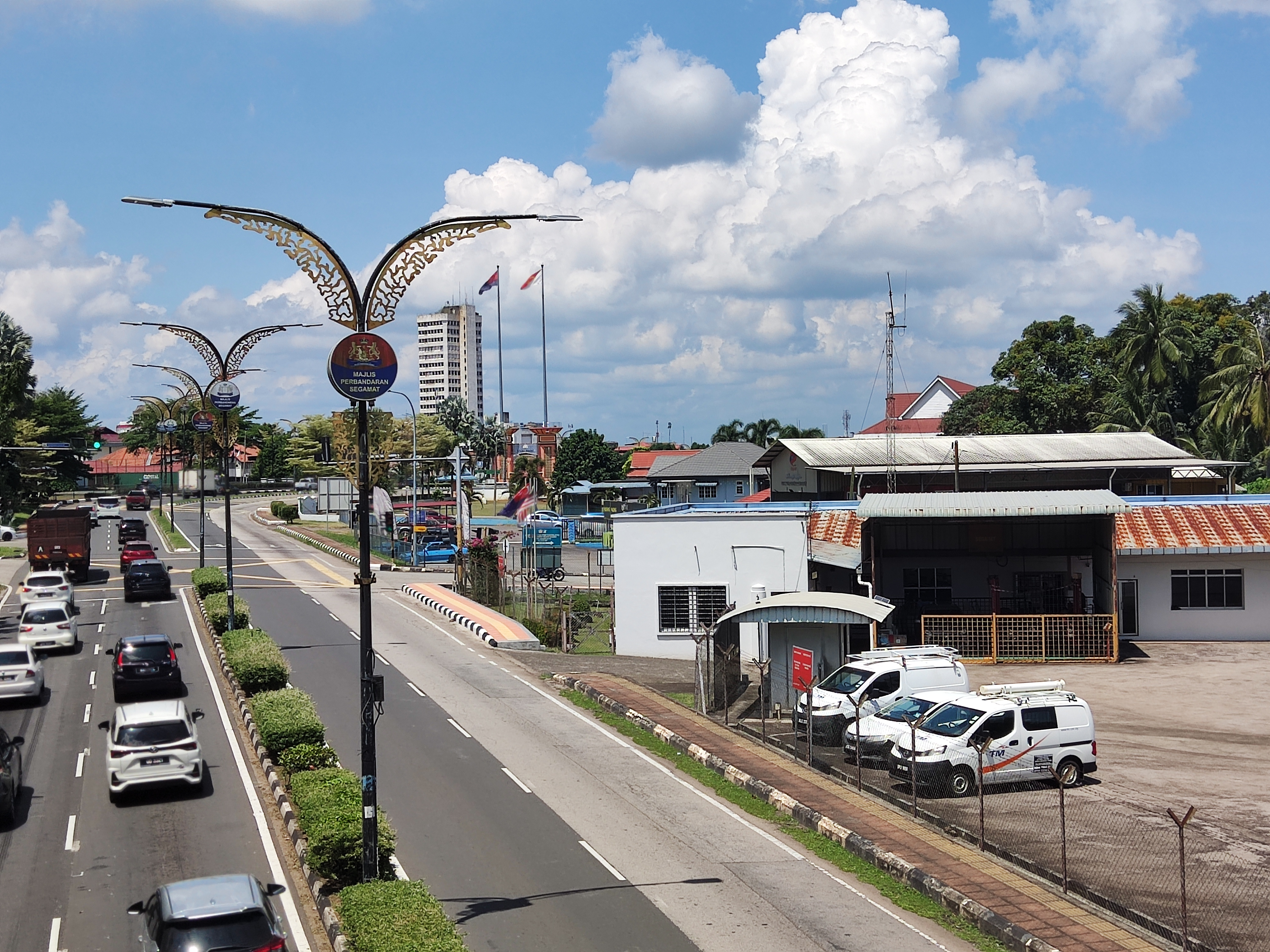
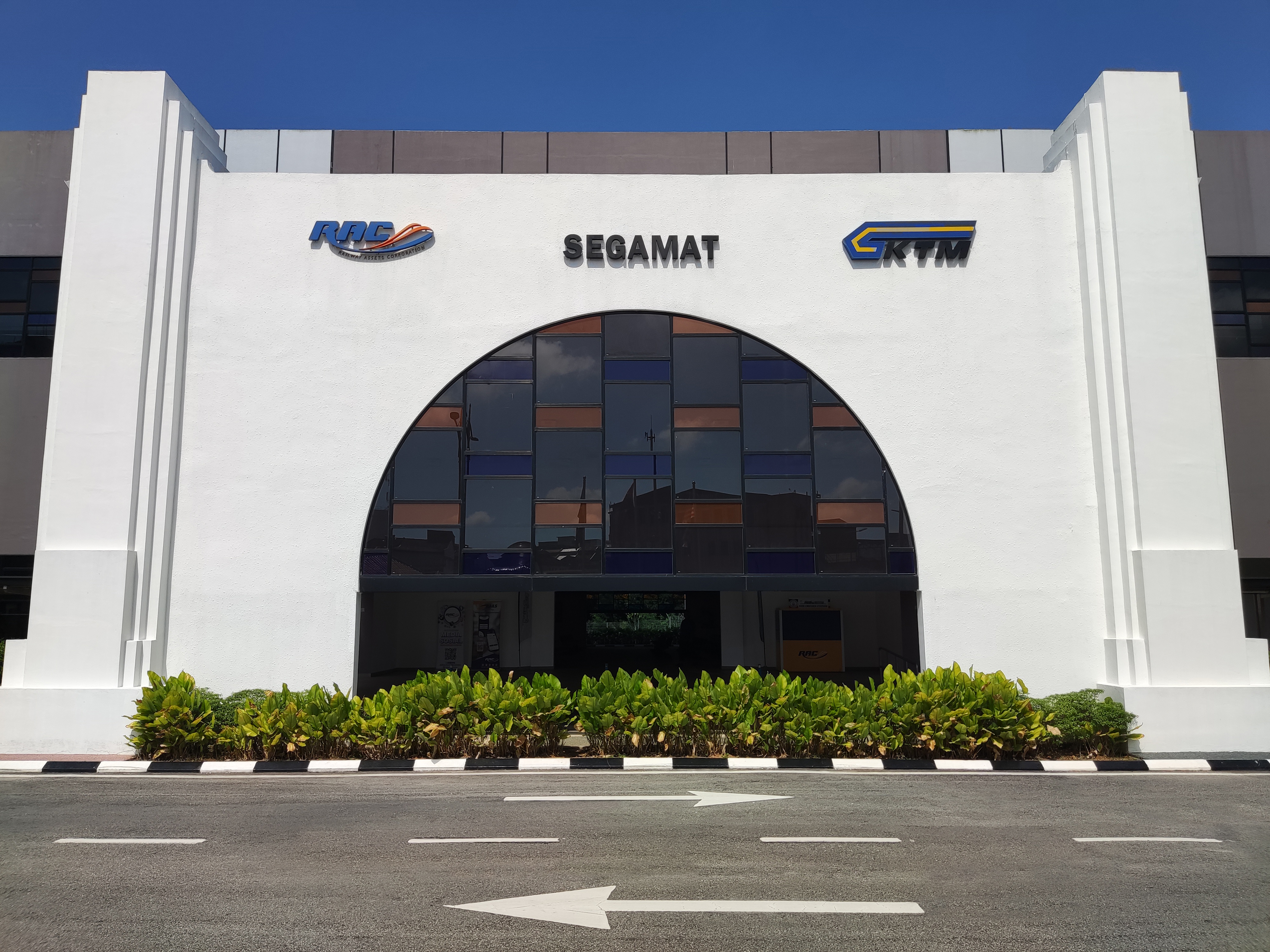
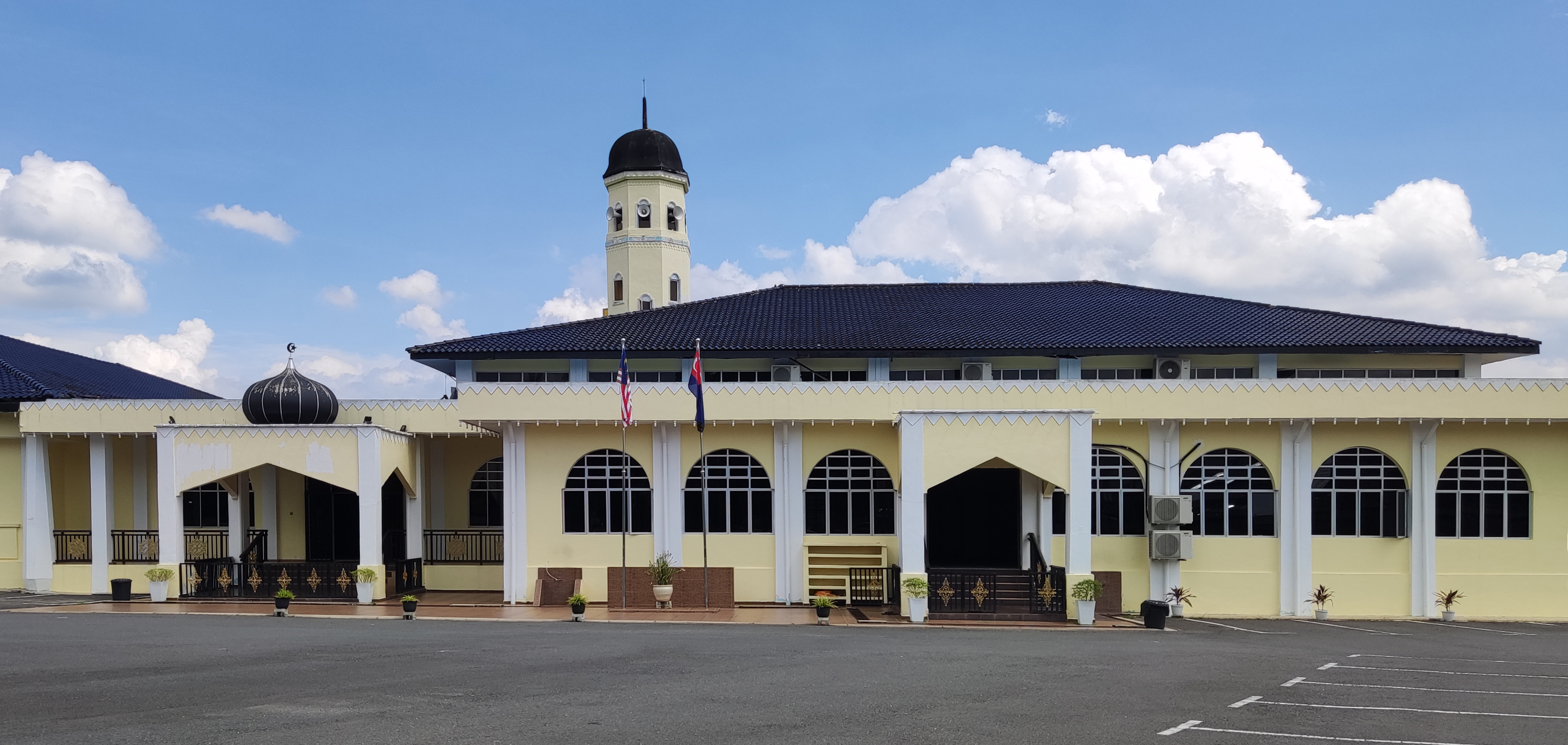
- Johor Crown Monument at Batu Hampar Rock Garden Segamat Square Downtown Segamat Segamat railway station Segamat Jamek Mosque

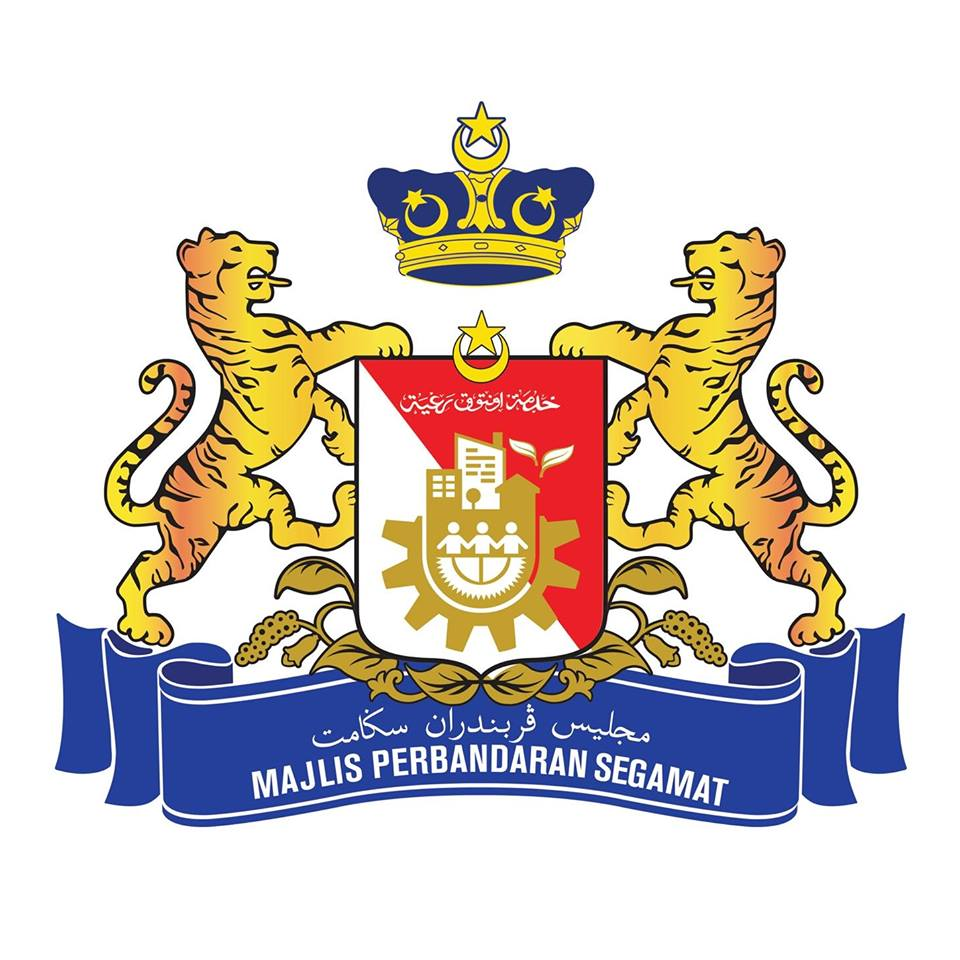
- Coat of arms
- Motto: Khidmat Untuk Rakyat; Serve the People (motto of Segamat Municipal Council)
- Location of Segamat in Johor
- Segamat in Johor Segamat (Malaysia) Segamat (Southeast Asia) Segamat (Asia)
- Coordinates: 2°30′40″N 102°48′50″E
- Country: Malaysia
- State: Johor
- District: Segamat District
- Establishment: 1912
- Granted district council status: 1 January 1977
- Granted municipal status: 1 January 2018

Government
  - Type: Municipal council
  - Body: Segamat Municipal Council
  - President: Mohd Helmi Sha'ri @ Shangari (Since 1 January 2024)

Area
  - District: 2,851 km^{2} (1,101 sq mi)
  - Urban: 265.53 km^{2} (102.52 sq mi)

Population (2023)
  - District: 197,762
  - Density: 69.37/km^{2} (179.7/sq mi)
  - Urban: 95,265
  - Rural: 102,497
- Postcode: 85xxx 734xx (Gemas and Batu Anam)
- Telephone area code: +60-07 +60-06 (Batu Anam)
- Vehicle registration: J
- Website: mpsegamat.gov.my

Segamat is a town and district capital and the main economic centre of Segamat District, the northernmost district of the Malaysian state of Johor.

== History ==
Buyong Adil in his book "Sejarah Alam Melayu" wrote that Segamat is one of the nine states that became a part of Negeri Sembilan as a result of a legendary event. Martin Lister, the British Resident of Negeri Sembilan between 1895 and 1897 also mentioned that Segamat was one of the states that was said to be collectively known as Negeri Sembilan in the past which was controlled by Temenggong Abdul Rahman and appointed a local governor, Temenggong Konit to administer Segamat and Muar from 1801. Segamat was then seceded to Johor by the British, along with Ulu Pahang (Bera and Temerloh) to Pahang, Beranang (Kajang, Semenyih and Hulu Langat) and Klang (Sepang and Kuala Langat) to Selangor excluding Lukut which is now part of Port Dickson.

The local council of Segamat, Segamat Municipal Council was originally a Town Board established in 1912 to register vehicles and dogs, provide street lighting, manage water supply, fire services and public markets. Only in 1925, the control of public health was made one of its main functions. Then in 1935, the control of public and private roads, buildings, urban development, urban planning and other services and facilities were added to the list of functions and responsibilities.

A flood in Segamat happened in March 2023 and was the worst in 17 years.

== Government and politics ==
Segamat Municipal Council Majlis Perbandaran Segamat
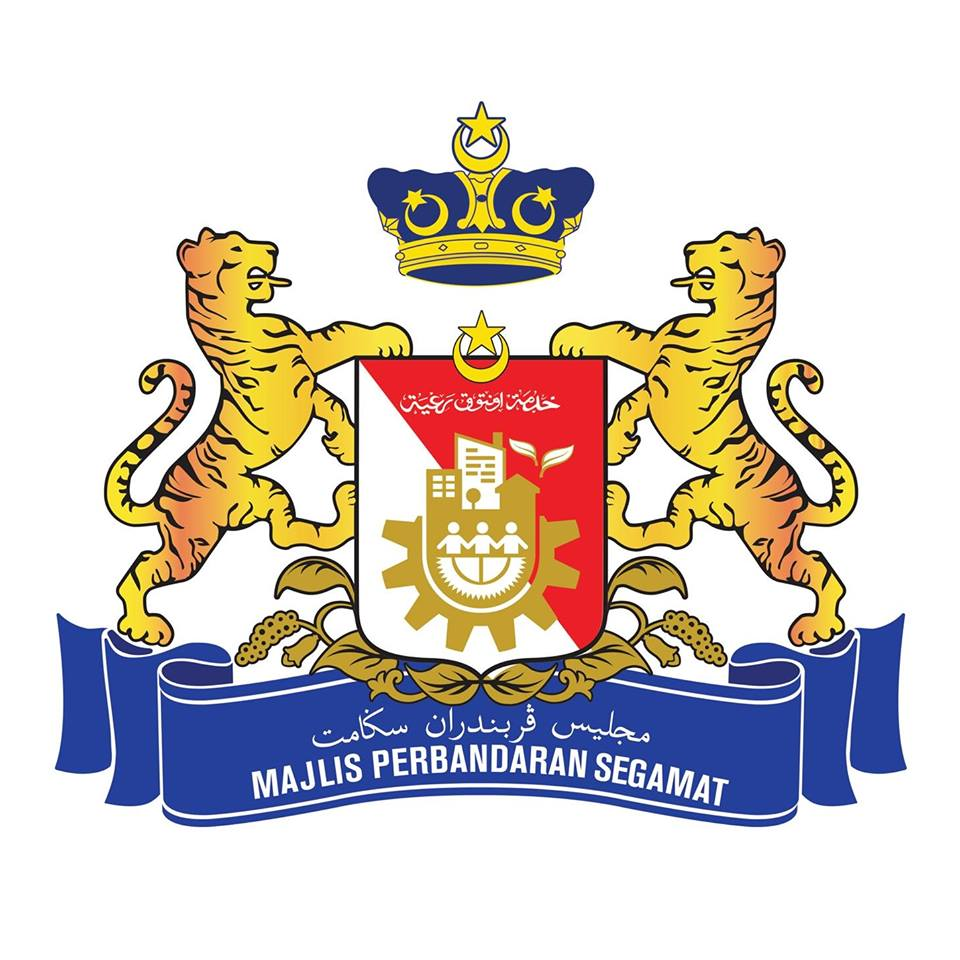
- Emblem

Type
- Type: Local authority of Segamat (town)

History
- Founded: 1 January 2018
- Preceded by: Segamat District Council

Leadership
- President: Mohd Helmi Sha'ri @ Shangari (Since 1 January 2024)
- Secretary: Mohd Fazle Mohd Yusop

Structure
- Seats: 24
- Political groups: Councillors: BN (24): UMNO (13); MCA (8); MIC (3)
- Length of term: 1 April 2024–31 December 2025

Motto
- Khidmat Untuk Rakyat (Serve the People)

Meeting place
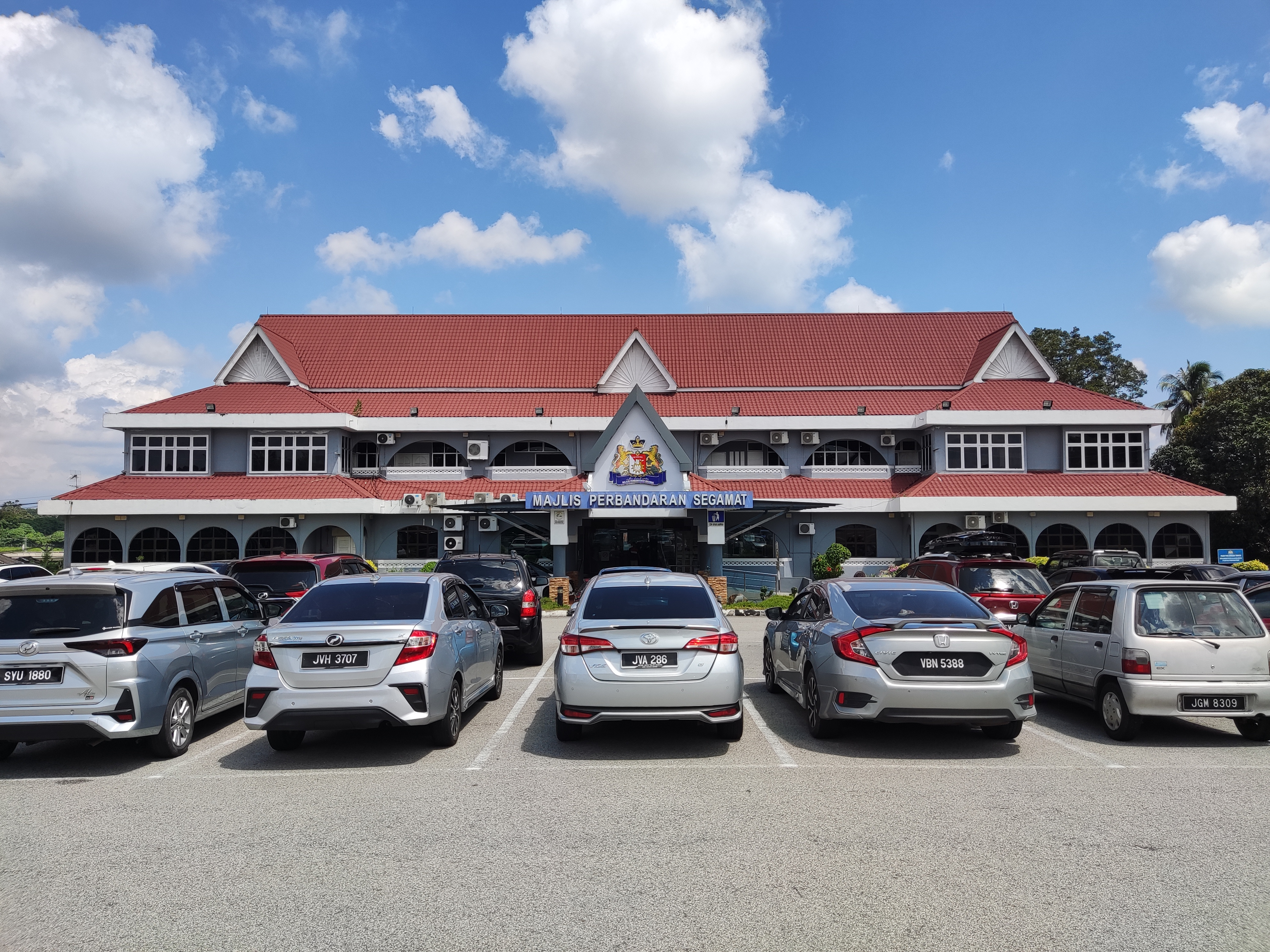
- Wisma MPS, No 1, Jalan Abdullah, 85000 Segamat, Johor Darul Ta'zim

Website
- mpsegamat.gov.my

Segamat Municipal Council (Malay: Majlis Perbandaran Segamat), formerly known as the Segamat Town Board (Malay: Lembaga Bandaran Segamat) from 1912 until 1951, Segamat Town Council (Malay: Majlis Bandaran Segamat) from 1951 until 1976, the North Segamat District Council (Malay: Majlis Daerah Segamat Utara) from 1 January 1977 until 29 November 2000 and the Segamat District Council (Malay: Majlis Daerah Segamat) from 30 November 2000 until 31 December 2017, is the local authority of Segamat town.

=== Emblem history ===
The former emblem of Segamat District Council consisted of three octagons on a pole or pillar, each contained from left to right a Spanish Cherry (Malay: Bunga Tanjung, said to be the State flower of Johor), buildings and durian (said to be the most popular fruit in Segamat District) encircled by the name of the local government in Jawi and Romanised Malay.

Upon the upgradation of Segamat District Council as the Segamat Municipal Council on 1 January 2018, the newly established municipal council adopted an emblem with a completely new design that looks like the Coat of arms of Johor. It consists of a shield with colours of the Segamat District Flag (divided per bend in red and white) charged with a combined image of tree, buildings, human figures and cogwheel in Gold and White colour (symbolising urban planning) under the Council's motto in Jawi Malay – Khidmat Untuk Rakyat (Serve the People) and a yellow crescent and star. The shield is supported by two Johor State arms tigers on both sides and is topped by the Johor Royal Crown. At the bottom of the shield is a blue ribbon decorated with black pepper wreaths as the state's agricultural product, written with the name of the Municipal Council in both Jawi and Romanised Malay.

Emblem of Segamat District Council (2000–2018)

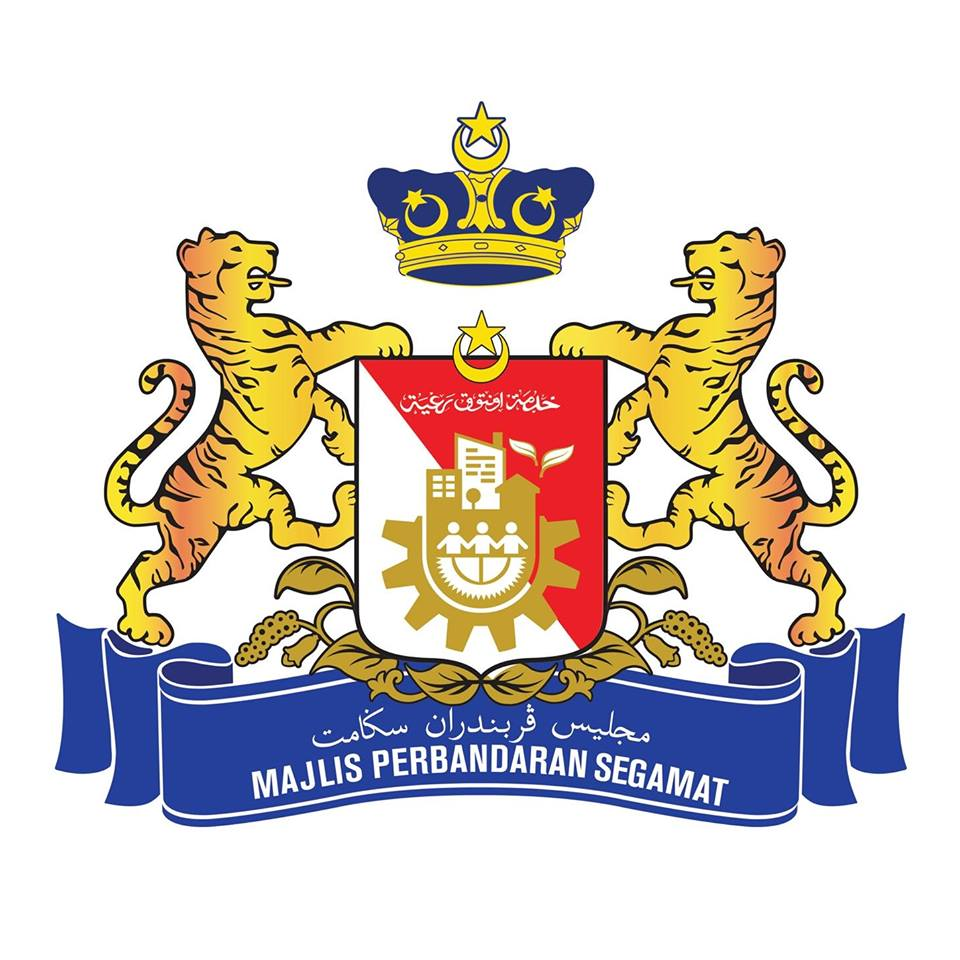
Emblem of Segamat Municipal Council (2018–present)

=== Operational and control areas ===
The Segamat Municipal Council operational area covers an area of 148.20 square kilometres with 70.10 square kilometres in Segamat City while 78.10 square kilometres are in small centres. The Segamat Municipal Council control area, which is an area that is not serviced but is subject to the MPS by-laws, covers an area of 1,268.28 square kilometres. The total area of the MPS area is 1,416.48 square kilometres.

As of 2025, Segamat is divided into 24 zones represented by 24 councillors to act as mediators between residents and the municipal council. The councillors for the 1 April 2024 to 31 December 2025 session are as below:

| Zone | Councillor | Political affiliation |
|---|---|---|
| Jalan Pemuda-Gubah | Rahana Mohamed | UMNO |
| Town Centre | Eric Teo Kim San | MCA |
| Taman Utama | Khairul Anwar Othman | UMNO |
| Jalan Muar | Norshida Ibrahim | UMNO |
| Gemereh Batu 7 | Roeny Md Zein | UMNO |
| Jementah | See Ann Giap | MCA |
| Taman Yayasan | Samsuri Ismail | UMNO |
| Bukit Jementah | Hajar Mohamed | UMNO |
| Buloh Kasap | Loo Geok Lin | MCA |
| Tasek Alai | Mohd Nordin Salamon | UMNO |
| Batu Anam | Sasidharan Achutan | MIC |
| Kampung Kenangan | Mohd Aidil Othman | UMNO |
| Gemas Baru | Mohamad Gazali Maslan | UMNO |
| Kampung Abdullah | Tay Kok Wea | MCA |
| Kampung Jawa | Ahmad Sukaimi Othman | UMNO |
| Tahang Rimau | Muhamad Syaznie Saklani | UMNO |
| Kampung Tengah-Tunku Tiga | Tan Mei Lee | MCA |
| Jabi | Yoong Soong Siang | MCA |
| Segamat Baru | Suhaimi Abd Kadir | UMNO |
| Bandar IOI West | Viren Vellayutham | MIC |
| Bandar IOI East | Thang Sin Fong | MCA |
| IOI Segamat Estate | Arumugam Selvarajan | MIC |
| Bukit Siput | Tong Liang Fook | MCA |
| Pogoh | Zaini Ahmad@Akman | UMNO |
