= Jementah =

- Mukim
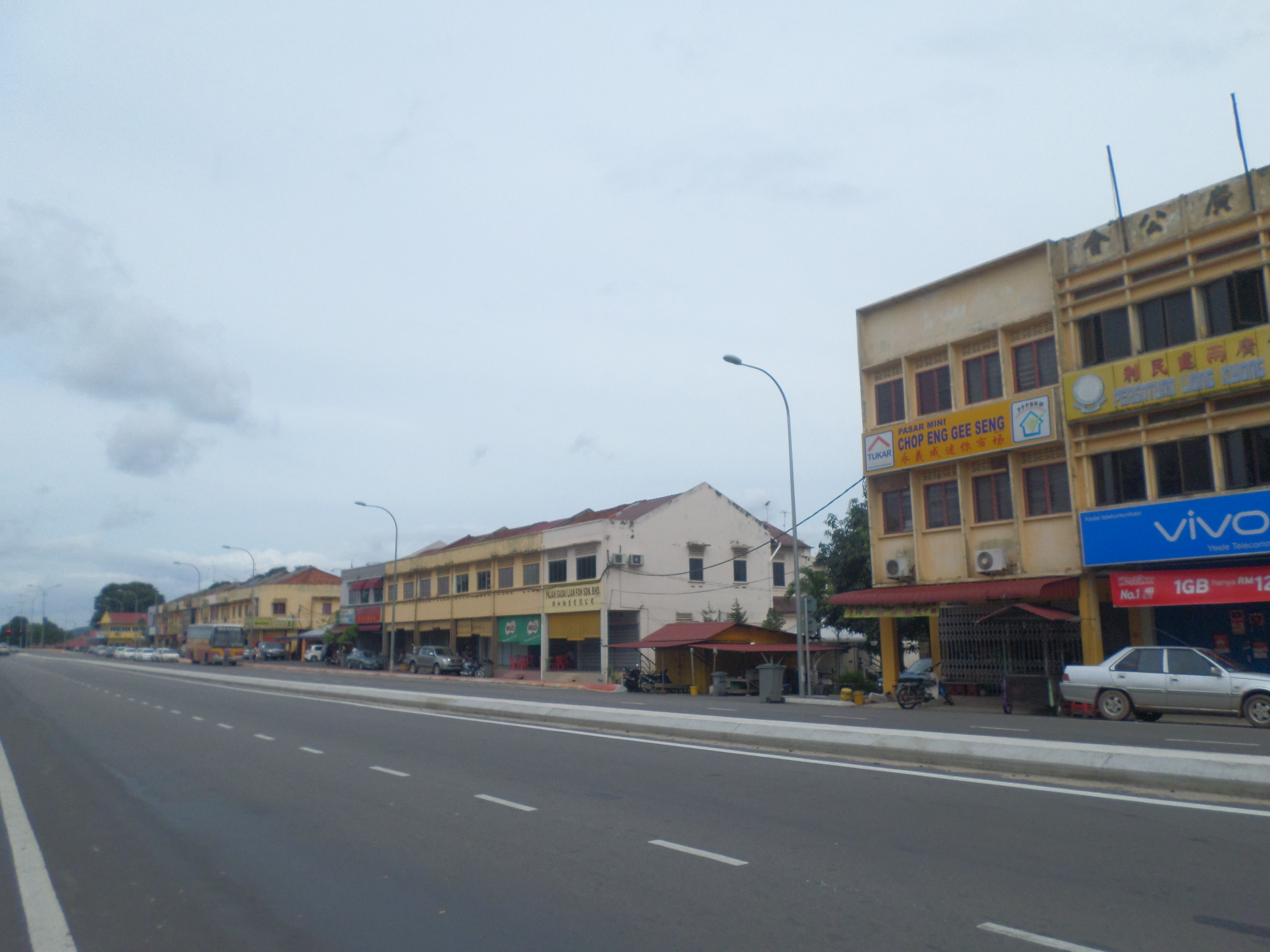

- Jementah in Malaysia Jementah (Malaysia) Jementah (Asia)
- Coordinates: 2°26′N 102°41′E
- Country: Malaysia
- State: Johor
- District: Segamat

Area
  - Total: 228 km^{2} (88 sq mi)

Population (2010)
  - Total: 18,823
  - Density: 82.6/km^{2} (214/sq mi)

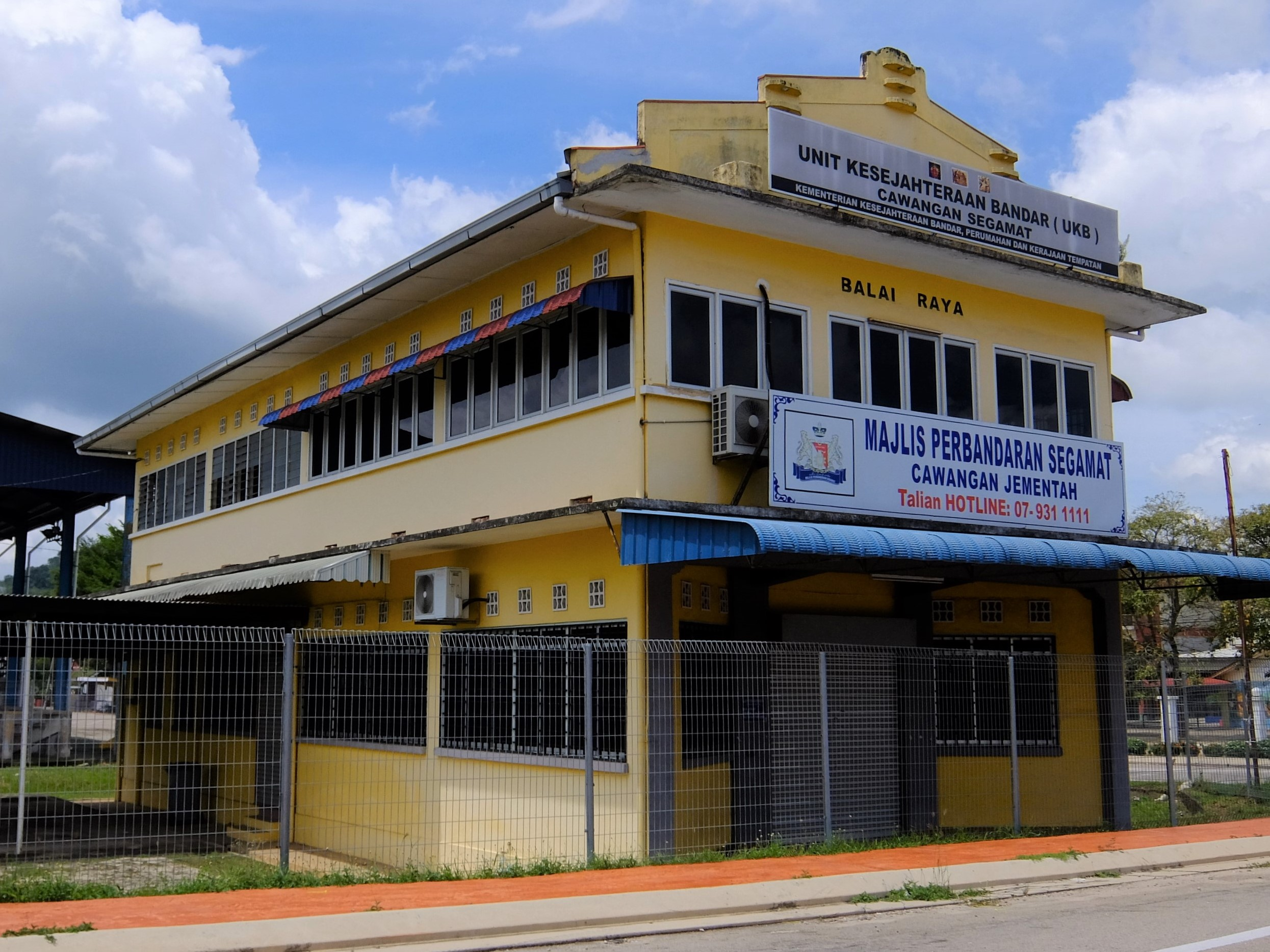
Segamat Municipal Council Jementah Branch

Jementah (Jawi: جمنته) is a mukim in Segamat District, Johor, Malaysia.

== Name ==
There are two versions of stories of how Jementah got its name. The first version was during the foundation of a village which later became Jementah town center, some villagers complained, "Jemu, jemu, jemu! Asyik-asyik menebas lalang saja!" which literally meant that they felt bored for only cutting long grasses, and the others replied, "Entah, entah, entah!" (I don't know, I don't know, I don't know!). From the Malay words jemu and entah, local residents believed that the combination of those words formed the word Jementah.

Another version stated that the villagers were bored and tired of removing leeches which sucked their blood when they were working, and therefore the combination of the words jemu and lintah which means leech in Malay formed the word Jementah.

== History ==
Jementah was once a site of the historic civil war in modern Johor history known as Jementah Civil War on 25 October 1879.

== Geography ==
Jementah in Segamat District

With a total area of 228 km^{2}, Jementah is the 5th largest mukim in Segamat District.

== Demographics ==
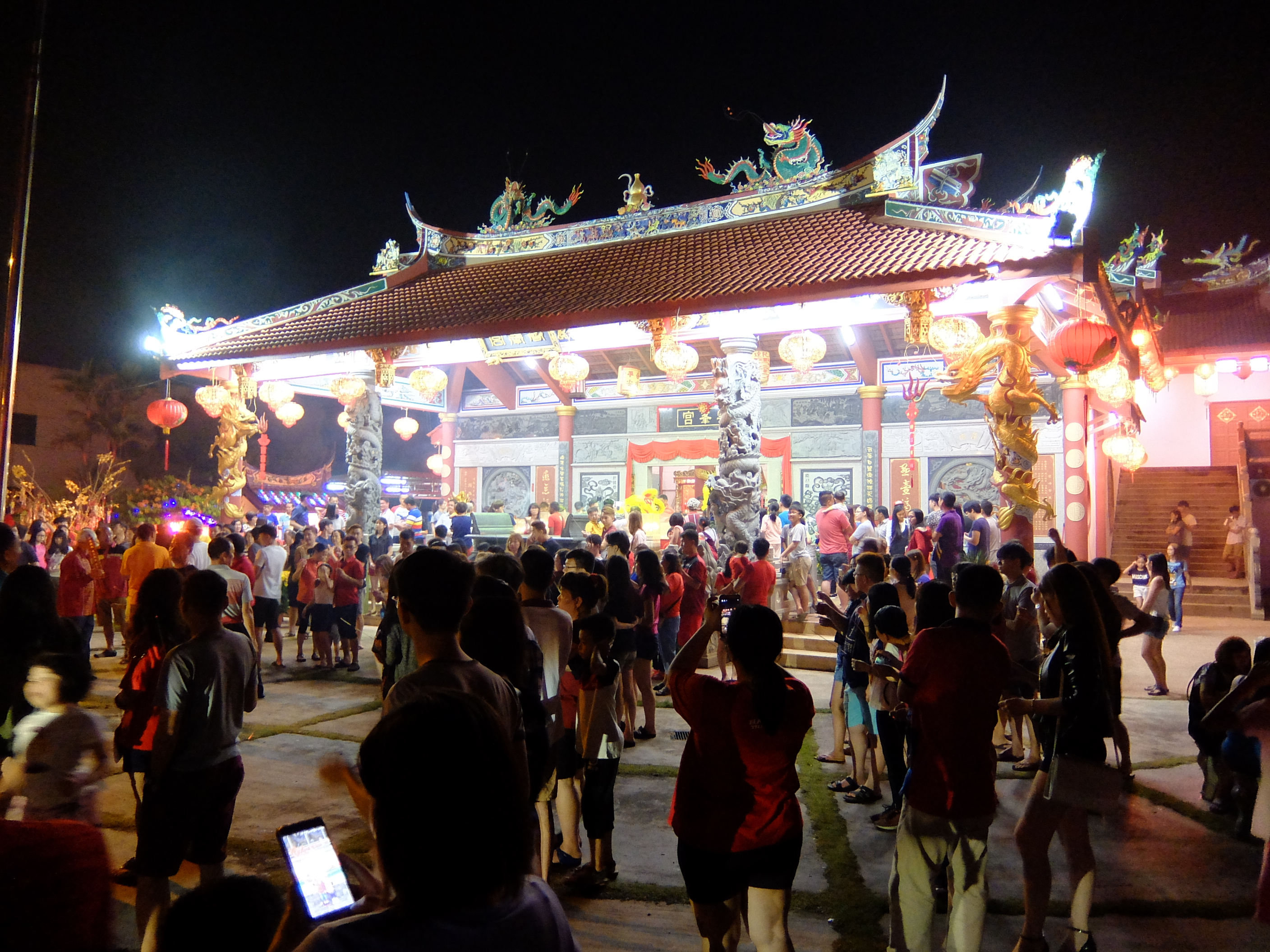
Yin Fong Temple in Jementah.

As of 2010, Jementah has a total population of 18,823 people.

== Economy ==
The town is the largest pomelo producer in Johor. It is also famous for its durian produce.

== Education ==
=== University ===
- Universiti Teknologi MARA Johor Campus branch

=== Secondary school ===
- Sekolah Menengah Kebangsaan Tun Sri Lanang
- Sekolah Menengah Kebangsaan Seri Jementah
- Sekolah Menengah Kebangsaan Jementah

=== Primary school ===
- Sekolah Kebangsaan Seri Jaya
- Sekolah Kebangsaan RKT Sri Ledang
- Sekolah Kebangsaan Paya Jakas
- Sekolah Kebangsaan Ladang Welch
- Sekolah Kebangsaan Jementah
- Sekolah Kebangsaan Bukit Tunggal
- Sekolah Jenis Kebangsaan (Tamil) Ladang Nagappa
- Sekolah Jenis Kebangsaan (Cina) Lian Hwa
- Sekolah Jenis Kebangsaan (Cina) Kebun Bahru
- Sekolah Jenis Kebangsaan (Cina) Jementah 1
- Sekolah Jenis Kebangsaan (Cina) Jementah (2)

== Transportation ==
Strategically located 16 km from Segamat Town via Federal Route 23.

== See also ==
- Segamat
- Sultan Abu Bakar of Johor
