= Bibi Sharliza Mohd Khalid =

Malaysian politician

Yang Berbahagia Datin Seri Dato' Hajah Bibi Sharliza binti Mohd Khalid DBNS MLA
- بيبي شرليزا محمّد خالد

Member of the Negeri Sembilan State Legislative Assembly for Juasseh
- Incumbent
- Assumed office 12 August 2023
- Preceded by: Ismail Lasim (BN–UMNO)
- Majority: 78 (2023)

Women Chief of the United Malays National Organisation of Negeri Sembilan
- Incumbent
- Assumed office 31 March 2023
- President: Ahmad Zahid Hamidi
- National Women Chief: Noraini Ahmad
- Deputy: Zuredah Mohamad
- Preceded by: Lateffah Ali Kunju

Member of the Negeri Sembilan State Legislative Assembly for Paroi
- In office 21 March 2004 – 8 March 2008
- Preceded by: constituency established
- Succeeded by: Mohamad Taufek Abd Ghani (PR–PAS)
- Majority: 4,107 (2004)

Personal details
- Born: 19 November 1971 (age 54)
- Party: United Malays National Organisation (UMNO)
- Other political affiliations: Barisan Nasional (BN)
- Spouse: Mohd Isa Abdul Samad (m. 2010)
- Relations: Mohd Najib Mohd Isa (Stepson)
- Occupation: Politician

Bibi Sharliza binti Mohd Khalid is a Malaysian politician who served as Member of the Negeri Sembilan State Legislative Assembly (MLA) for Juasseh since August 2023 as well as Paroi from March 2004 to March 2008. She is a member, Women Chief of Negeri Sembilan and Women Chief of Kuala Pilah of the United Malays National Organisation (UMNO), a component party of Barisan Nasional (BN).

== Election results ==
Negeri Sembilan State Legislative Assembly
Year	Constituency	Candidate	Votes	Pct	Opponent(s)	Votes	Pct	Ballots cast	Majority	Turnout
2004	N25 Paroi	Bibi Sharliza Mohd Khalid (UMNO)	7,524	68.77%	Rosli Yaakop (PAS)	3,417	31.23%	11,250	4,107	75.70%
2023	N15 Juasseh	Bibi Sharliza Mohd Khalid (UMNO)	4,549	50.43%	Eddin Syazlee Shith (BERSATU)	4,471	49.57%	9,107	78	67.92%

== Honours ==
- Negeri Sembilan
  - Knight of the Order of Loyal Service to Negeri Sembilan (DBNS) – Dato' (2025)
