= Hasan Malek =

Malaysian politician (born 1946)

Yang Berbahagia Dato' Sri Hasan Malek SSNS SSAP DMSM DSNS DSAP AMN JP
- حسن مالك

Minister of Domestic Trade, Cooperatives and Consumerism
- In office 16 May 2013 – 29 July 2015
- Monarch: Abdul Halim
- Prime Minister: Najib Razak
- Deputy: Ahmad Bashah Md Hanipah
- Preceded by: Ismail Sabri Yaakob
- Succeeded by: Hamzah Zainudin
- Constituency: Kuala Pilah

Deputy Minister of Rural and Regional Development I
- In office 10 April 2009 – 15 May 2013 Serving with Joseph Entulu Belaun
- Monarchs: Mizan Zainal Abidin; Abdul Halim
- Prime Minister: Najib Razak
- Minister: Shafie Apdal
- Preceded by: Joseph Kurup
- Succeeded by: Alexander Nanta Linggi
- Constituency: Kuala Pilah

Deputy Minister in the Prime Minister's Department
- In office 19 March 2008 – 9 April 2009
- Monarch: Mizan Zainal Abidin
- Prime Minister: Abdullah Ahmad Badawi
- Minister: Mohamed Nazri Abdul Aziz; Zaid Ibrahim (2008)
- Preceded by: M. Kayveas
- Succeeded by: Liew Vui Keong; Murugiah Thopasamy
- Constituency: Kuala Pilah

Member of the Malaysian Parliament for Kuala Pilah
- In office 21 March 2004 – 9 May 2018
- Preceded by: Napsiah Omar (BN–UMNO)
- Succeeded by: Eddin Syazlee Shith (PH–BERSATU)
- Majority: 13,342 (2004); 10,008 (2008); 9,661 (2013)

Member of the Negeri Sembilan State Legislative Assembly for Juasseh
- In office 25 April 1995 – 21 March 2004
- Preceded by: Mohamad Ahmad (BN–UMNO)
- Succeeded by: Mohammad Razi Kail (BN–UMNO)
- Majority: 4,291 (1995); 985 (1999)

Personal details
- Born: Hasan bin Malek; 24 April 1946 (age 80) Negeri Sembilan, Malayan Union (now Malaysia)
- Party: United Malays National Organisation (UMNO)
- Other political affiliations: Barisan Nasional (BN)
- Spouse: Norainee binti Mohd Yatib
- Education: University of Malaya University of Manchester
- Occupation: Politician

Hasan bin Malek (Jawi: حسن بن مالك; born 24 April 1946) is a Malaysian politician who served as the Member of Parliament (MP) for Kuala Pilah from March 2004 to May 2018. and formerly the Ambassador of Malaysia to Cambodia. He was the federal Minister of Domestic Trade, Cooperatives and Consumerism. He is a member of the United Malays National Organisation (UMNO), a component party of the Barisan Nasional (BN) coalition.

In the 1995 general election and 1999 general election, Hasan won the state seat of Juasseh in the Negeri Sembilan State Legislative Assembly. He remained in the State Assembly until the 2004 election, in which he was elected to the federal Parliament for the seat of Kuala Pilah. He was re-elected in 2008 and 2013. After the 2008 election he became a deputy minister, and after the 2013 election, he was appointed as the Minister of Domestic Trade Cooperative and Consumerism in the Cabinet of Prime Minister Najib Razak.

In the 2018 general election, Hasan lost to Eddin Syazlee Shith of Parti Pribumi Bersatu Malaysia (BERSATU), in a three-corner fight with Rafiei Mustapha of Pan-Malaysian Islamic Party (PAS) for the Kuala Pilah parliamentary seat.

== Controversy ==
On 29 August 2019, the High Court had allowed the government's forfeiture of RM100,000 frozen from Hasan's bank account earlier in July in connection with the 1Malaysia Development Berhad (1MDB) scandal investigation.

== Election results ==
Negeri Sembilan State Legislative Assembly
Year	Constituency	Candidate	Votes	Pct	Opponent(s)	Votes	Pct	Ballots cast	Majority	Turnout
1995	N13 Juasseh	Hasan Malek (UMNO)	4,979	87.86%	Mat Rais Paris (S46)	688	12.14%		4,291	
1999	N13 Juasseh	Hasan Malek (UMNO)	3,495	58.20%	Shamsul Bahri Shamsudin (keADILan)	2,510	41.80%	6,242	985	71.45%

Parliament of Malaysia
Year	Constituency	Candidate	Votes	Pct	Opponent(s)	Votes	Pct	Ballots cast	Majority	Turnout
2004	P129 Kuala Pilah	Hasan Malek (UMNO)	22,105	71.61%	Annuar Mohd Salleh (PKR)	8,763	28.39%	31,778	13,342	73.74%
2008	P129 Kuala Pilah	Hasan Malek (UMNO)	20,417	66.23%	Annuar Mohd Salleh (PKR)	10,409	33.77%	31,734	10,008	74.97%
2013	P129 Kuala Pilah	Hasan Malek (UMNO)	24,507	62.27%	Mohd Nazree Mohd Yunus (PKR)	14,846	37.73%	40,291	9,661	84.52%
2018	P129 Kuala Pilah	Hasan Malek (UMNO)	17,845	44.35%	Eddin Syazlee Shith (BERSATU)	18,045	44.85%	41,156	200	82.64%
2018	P129 Kuala Pilah	Hasan Malek (UMNO)	17,845	44.35%	Rafiei Mustapha (PAS)	4,347	10.80%	41,156	200	82.64%

== Honours ==
- Malaysia
  - Member of the Order of the Defender of the Realm (AMN) (1981)
- Malacca
  - Companion Class I of the Exalted Order of Malacca (DMSM) – Datuk (2000)
- Negeri Sembilan
  - Knight Grand Companion of the Order of Loyalty to Negeri Sembilan (SSNS) – Dato' Seri (2015)
  - Knight Commander of the Order of Loyalty to Negeri Sembilan (DSNS) – Dato' (2005)
  - Justice of the Peace of Negeri Sembilan (JP) (1998)
- Pahang
  - Grand Knight of the Order of Sultan Ahmad Shah of Pahang (SSAP) – Dato' Sri (2013)
  - Knight Companion of the Order of Sultan Ahmad Shah of Pahang (DSAP) – Dato' (2011)
