= Ismail Lasim =

Malaysian politician (born 1959)

Yang Amat Berhormat Dato' Haji Ismail bin Lasim DSNS PMC MLA
- إسماعيل لاسيم

9th Menteri Besar of Negeri Sembilan
- Incumbent
- Assumed office 2 August 2026
- Monarch: Muhriz
- Preceded by: Aminuddin Harun
- Constituency: Juasseh

Executive Council Portfolios (Negeri Sembilan)
- 2023–2026: Education and Human Capital Development
- 2013–2018: Unity and National Integration
- 2008–2013: Infrastructure, Water, Energy and Telecommunications
- 2004–2008: Public Works, Telecommunications and Posts

Member of the Negeri Sembilan State Legislative Assembly for Juasseh
- Incumbent
- Assumed office 1 August 2026
- Preceded by: Bibi Sharliza Mohd Khalid
- Majority: 4,091 (2026)
- In office 9 May 2018 – 12 August 2023
- Preceded by: Mohammad Razi Kail (BN–UMNO)
- Succeeded by: Bibi Sharliza Mohd Khalid (BN–UMNO)
- Majority: 692 (2018)

Member of the Negeri Sembilan State Legislative Assembly for Senaling
- In office 12 August 2023 – 1 August 2026
- Preceded by: Adnan Abu Hassan (BN–UMNO)
- Succeeded by: Qayyum Abd Jalil (BN–UMNO)
- Majority: 662 (2023)
- In office 29 November 1999 – 9 May 2018
- Preceded by: Zainal Mokhtar Mohd Yunus (BN–UMNO)
- Succeeded by: Adnan Abu Hassan (BN–UMNO)
- Majority: 1,027 (1999); 2,516 (2004); 2,014 (2008); 2,151 (2013)

Personal details
- Born: Ismail bin Lasim; 15 April 1959 (age 67) Kampung Tebing Tinggi, Juasseh, Negeri Sembilan, Federation of Malaya
- Citizenship: Malaysia
- Party: UMNO
- Other political affiliations: Barisan Nasional
- Spouse: Datin Hajah Noraishah binti Othman
- Education: University of Malaya (LLB)
- Occupation: Politician
- Profession: Lawyer

Ismail bin Lasim (born 15 April 1959) is a Malaysian politician and lawyer who is serving as the ninth Menteri Besar of Negeri Sembilan since 2 August 2026. A member of the United Malays National Organisation (UMNO), he is the deputy chair and information chief of the party's Negeri Sembilan state liaison committee as well as division chief of UMNO's Kuala Pilah division.

== Political career ==
Ismail was first elected as a member of the Negeri Sembilan State Legislative Assembly (MLA) representing Senaling following the conclusion of the 1999 Malaysian state elections and successfully defended the seat for the following three election cycles and also during the 2023–2026 term. Between May 2018 to August 2023, he represented Juasseh having won the constituency in 2018 and again since August 2026.

From March 2004 to May 2018, Ismail served three consecutive terms as an executive councillor (EXCO) of the Negeri Sembilan State Executive Council in the Barisan Nasional (BN) administrations of the seventh Menteri Besar, Mohamad Hasan, holding different portfolios during each of the terms.

Ismail was selected to serve as an EXCO again from August 2023 by the eighth Menteri Besar, Aminuddin Harun, in the joint Pakatan Harapan (PH)–BN government until its collapse in August 2026.

=== Menteri Besar of Negeri Sembilan ===
On 2 August 2026, Ismail was sworn in as the ninth Menteri Besar following the 2026 Negeri Sembilan state election at the Seri Menanti Grand Palace. Prior to announcing his BN–Perikatan Nasional (PN) executive council line-up, Ismail's appointment was questioned by one of his predecessors, Rais Yatim, who alleged "outside interference" in Ismail's appointment.

==== 2026 Negeri Sembilan constitutional crisis ====
In early September 2026, Ismail became involved in a constitutional dispute related to the position of the Yang di-Pertuan Besar of Negeri Sembilan, the ruler of the state. Ismail was alleged to have signed a proclamation removing incumbent the Yang di-Pertuan Besar, Muhriz of Negeri Sembilan, on 3 August, a day after he had been sworn in by Muhriz as Menteri Besar.

Ismail claimed to have been coerced into signing the proclamation, further arguing that the proclamation did not comply with the procedures specified in the Laws of the Constitution of Negeri Sembilan and was thus unenforceable. He publicly declared his support for Muhriz.

However, on 15 September, Ismail and his executive council subsequently issued a directive to the state secretary to gazette the proclamation. This resulted in the executive council's dismissal by Muhriz, with Ismail remaining in his position.

Ismail was publicly rebuked by Muhriz for his role in the crisis on 16 October, following Friday prayers at Masjid Kariah Beting in Kuala Pilah, being told by Muhriz to "go away".

On 14 November, Ismail announced that he had retracted a letter sent to the Malay rulers declaring Tunku Nadzaruddin, the pretender, as Yang di-Pertuan Besar. Two days later, news outlets reported that he had submitted his resignation, which was revealed by Barisan Nasional secretary-general Zambry Abdul Kadir. On 20 November, during an audience with Muhriz, Ismail denied that he had submitted or that he had consented to the submission of his resignation. He subsequently told reporters that he had been told to remain in office; However, the palace later clarified that they had not asked Ismail to remain Menteri Besar, and that he still needed to prove he had the support of the majority of state legislators.

== Election results ==
Negeri Sembilan State Legislative Assembly
Year	Constituency	Candidate	Votes	Pct	Opponent(s)	Votes	Pct	Ballots cast	Majority	Turnout
1999	N14 Senaling	Ismail Lasim (UMNO)	3,097	59.94%	Baharudin Poan (PAS)	2,070	40.06%	5,332	1,027	73.18%
2004	N17 Senaling	Ismail Lasim (UMNO)	3,860	74.17%	Zaharudin Osman (PAS)	1,344	25.83%	5,299	2,516	75.46%
2008	N17 Senaling	Ismail Lasim (UMNO)	3,647	69.09%	Zaharudin Osman (PAS)	1,632	30.91%	5,418	2,014	77.25%
2013	N17 Senaling	Ismail Lasim (UMNO)	4,450	65.94%	Zaharudin Osman (PAS)	2,299	34.06%	6,878	2,151	86.00%
2018	N15 Juasseh	Ismail Lasim (UMNO)	4,146	50.41%	Rosli Omar (PKR)	3,454	42.00%	8,388	692	83.10%
2018	N15 Juasseh	Ismail Lasim (UMNO)	4,146	50.41%	Hassan Mohamed (PAS)	624	7.59%	8,388	692	83.10%
2023	N17 Senaling	Ismail Lasim (UMNO)	3,724	54.88%	Amrina Mohammad Khalid (BERSATU)	3,062	45.12%	6,839	662	69.18%
2026	N15 Juasseh	Ismail Lasim (UMNO)	6,907	67.52%	Mohd Aidil Abdullah (PKR)	2,816	27.53%	10,229	4,091	75.49%
2026	N15 Juasseh	Ismail Lasim (UMNO)	6,907	67.52%	Mohd Zuhaimi Md Yusof (BERSATU)	506	4.95%	10,229	4,091	75.49%

== Honours ==
- Negeri Sembilan
  - Knight Companion of the Order of Loyalty to Negeri Sembilan (DSNS) – Dato' (2002)
