= Eddin Syazlee Shith =

Malaysian politician (1974–2024)

Yang Berbahagia Dato’ Eddin Syazlee Shith DPNS
- عيدين شاذلي بن شيث

Deputy Minister in the Prime Minister's Department (Economy)
- In office 30 August 2021 – 24 November 2022
- Monarch: Abdullah
- Prime Minister: Ismail Sabri Yaakob
- Minister: Mustapa Mohamed
- Preceded by: Arthur Joseph Kurup
- Succeeded by: Hanifah Hajar Taib (Deputy Minister of Economy)
- Constituency: Kuala Pilah

Deputy Minister of Works
- In office 6 July 2020 – 16 August 2021
- Monarch: Abdullah
- Prime Minister: Muhyiddin Yassin
- Minister: Fadillah Yusof
- Preceded by: Shahruddin Md Salleh
- Succeeded by: Arthur Joseph Kurup
- Constituency: Kuala Pilah

Deputy Minister in the Prime Minister's Department (Parliament and Law)
- In office 10 March 2020 – 6 July 2020
- Monarch: Abdullah
- Prime Minister: Muhyiddin Yassin
- Minister: Takiyuddin Hassan
- Preceded by: Mohamed Hanipa Maidin
- Succeeded by: Shabudin Yahaya
- Constituency: Kuala Pilah

Deputy Minister of Communications and Multimedia
- In office 2 July 2018 – 24 February 2020
- Monarchs: Muhammad V (2018–2019); Abdullah (2019–2020)
- Prime Minister: Mahathir Mohamad
- Minister: Gobind Singh Deo
- Preceded by: Jailani Johari
- Succeeded by: Zahidi Zainul Abidin
- Constituency: Kuala Pilah

1st State Advisor of the Perikatan Nasional of Negeri Sembilan
- In office 17 February 2024 – 20 September 2024
- National Chairman: Muhyiddin Yassin
- State Chairman: Mohamad Hanifah Abu Baker
- Preceded by: Position established
- Succeeded by: Position abolished

1st State Chairman of the Perikatan Nasional of Negeri Sembilan
- In office 5 January 2021 – 31 May 2023
- National Chairman: Muhyiddin Yassin
- Preceded by: Position established
- Succeeded by: Ahmad Faizal Azumu

Member of the Malaysian Parliament for Kuala Pilah
- In office 9 May 2018 – 19 November 2022
- Preceded by: Hasan Malek (BN–UMNO)
- Succeeded by: Adnan Abu Hassan (BN–UMNO)
- Majority: 200 (2018)

Faction represented in Dewan Rakyat
- 2018–2020: Pakatan Harapan
- 2020: Malaysian United Indigenous Party
- 2020–2022: Perikatan Nasional

Personal details
- Born: Eddin Syazlee bin Shith; 2 January 1974 Kuala Pilah, Negeri Sembilan, Malaysia
- Died: 20 September 2024 (aged 50) Bukit Chedang, Seremban, Negeri Sembilan, Malaysia
- Resting place: Bandar Ainsdale Muslim Cemetery, Seremban, Negeri Sembilan, Malaysia
- Citizenship: Malaysian
- Party: Malaysian United Indigenous Party (BERSATU)
- Other political affiliations: Pakatan Harapan (PH; 2017–2020); Perikatan Nasional (PN; 2020–2023)
- Children: 3

Eddin Syazlee bin Shith (Jawi: عيدين شاذلي بنشيث; 2 January 1974 – 20 September 2024) was a Malaysian politician who served as Deputy Minister in the Prime Minister's Department in charge of Economic Affairs in the Barisan Nasional (BN) administration under former Prime Minister Ismail Sabri Yaakob and former Minister Mustapa Mohamed from August 2021 to the collapse of the BN administration in November 2022, Deputy Minister of Works in the Perikatan Nasional (PN) administration under former Prime Minister Muhyiddin Yassin and former Minister Fadillah Yusof from July 2020 to the collapse of the PN administration in August 2021, the Deputy Minister in the Prime Minister's Department in charge of Parliament and Law in the PN administration under Muhyiddin and former Minister Takiyuddin Hassan from March 2020 to July 2020, Deputy Minister of Communications and Multimedia in the Pakatan Harapan (PH) administration under former Prime Minister Mahathir Mohamad and former Minister Saifuddin Abdullah from July 2018 to February 2020 and the Member of Parliament (MP) for Kuala Pilah from May 2018 to November 2022. He was a member of the Malaysian United Indigenous Party (BERSATU), a component party of the PN and formerly PH coalitions. He served as the 1st State Advisor of PN of Negeri Sembilan from February to his death in office in September 2024. and the 1st State Chairman of PN and BERSATU of Negeri Sembilan from January 2021 and September 2020 to his removal from the position in May 2023 respectively.

== Background ==
Born on 2 January 1974, in Kuala Pilah, Negeri Sembilan, he started his career as a lawyer before venturing into the political arena in 2006.

Eddin Syazlee held a Bachelor of Law (Hons) degree from the Universiti Teknologi MARA (UiTM) (2003), Masters in Law from Universiti Kebangsaan Malaysia (2009), and Diploma in Syariah Legal Practice from UiTM (2017).

He was married to Dr Nurul Azlin Ibrahim and the couple is blessed with two sons, aged five and one.

== Political career ==
In the 14th General Election, he contested under the PKR ticket, defeating the three-term Kuala Pilah incumbent, Hasan Malek.

== Controversies ==
In April 2021, Eddin Syazlee was embroiled in controversy when he was caught falling asleep during a convocation ceremony of a religious college in Seremban, of which he was the guest-of-honour. The local branch of his party BERSATU has since clarified that it was for health reasons.

== Death ==
At 7:10 MST on 20 September 2024, Eddin Syazlee died at his home in Bukit Chedang, Seremban, Negeri Sembilan, Malaysia. He was 50. State Chairman of PN of Negeri Sembilan Mohamad Hanifah Abu Baker said that the health of Eddin Syazlee had been deteriorating over the past five months and he had been receiving medical treatment. His remains were taken to Masjid Chedang for prayers and later laid to rest at the Bandar Ainsdale Muslim Cemetery. He left behind his wife, two sons and a daughter.

== Election results ==
Parliament of Malaysia
Year	Constituency	Candidate	Votes	Pct	Opponent(s)	Votes	Pct	Ballots cast	Majority	Turnout
2018	P129 Kuala Pilah	Eddin Syazlee Shith (BERSATU)	18,045	44.85%	Hasan Malek (UMNO)	17,845	44.35%	41,156	200	82.64%
2018	P129 Kuala Pilah	Eddin Syazlee Shith (BERSATU)	18,045	44.85%	Rafiei Mustapha (PAS)	4,347	10.80%	41,156	200	82.64%
2022	P129 Kuala Pilah	Eddin Syazlee Shith (BERSATU)	11,560	23.76%	Adnan Abu Hassan (UMNO)	21,423	44.02%	49,371	6,483	76.94%
2022	P129 Kuala Pilah	Eddin Syazlee Shith (BERSATU)	11,560	23.76%	Nor Azman Mohamad (PKR)	14,940	30.70%	49,371	6,483	76.94%
2022	P129 Kuala Pilah	Eddin Syazlee Shith (BERSATU)	11,560	23.76%	Kamarulzaman Kamdias (PUTRA)	406	0.83%	49,371	6,483	76.94%
2022	P129 Kuala Pilah	Eddin Syazlee Shith (BERSATU)	11,560	23.76%	Azman Idris (WARISAN)	333	0.68%	49,371	6,483	76.94%

Negeri Sembilan State Legislative Assembly
Year	Constituency	Candidate	Votes	Pct	Opponent(s)	Votes	Pct	Ballots cast	Majority	Turnout
2023	N15 Juasseh	Eddin Syazlee Shith (BERSATU)	4,471	49.57%	Bibi Sharliza Mohd Khalid (UMNO)	4,549	50.43%	9,107	78	67.92%

== Honours ==
- Negeri Sembilan
  - Knight Commander of the Order of Loyalty to Negeri Sembilan (DPNS) – Dato' (2020)
