= Zaifulbahri Idris =

Malaysian politician

Yang Berhormat Dato' Zaifulbahri Idris DPNS PJK MLA
- سيف البحري إدريس

Member of the Negeri Sembilan State Executive Council (Human Capital Development, Youth and Sports)
- In office 22 May 2013 – 12 May 2018
- Monarch: Muhriz
- Menteri Besar: Mohamad Hasan
- Preceded by: Abdul Samad Ibrahim
- Succeeded by: Mohamad Taufek Abd. Ghani (Youth and Sports); Mohamad Rafie Abdul Malek (Human Capital Development)
- Constituency: Chembong

Member of the Negeri Sembilan State Legislative Assembly for Chembong
- Incumbent
- Assumed office 8 March 2008
- Preceded by: Mohd Rais Zainuddin (BN–UMNO)
- Majority: 4,023 (2008); 6,480 (2013); 4,427 (2018); 4,335 (2023)

Personal details
- Born: Zaifulbahri bin Idris Negeri Sembilan, Malaysia
- Citizenship: Malaysian
- Party: United Malays National Organisation (UMNO)
- Other political affiliations: Barisan Nasional (BN)
- Occupation: Politician

Zaifulbahri bin Idris is a Malaysian politician who has served as Member of the Negeri Sembilan State Legislative Assembly (MLA) for Chembong since March 2008. He served as Member of the Negeri Sembilan State Executive Council (EXCO) in the Barisan Nasional (BN) state administration under former Menteri Besar Mohamad Hasan from May 2013 to the collapse of the BN state administration in May 2018. He is a member of the United Malays National Organisation (UMNO), a component party of the BN coalition.

== Election results ==
Negeri Sembilan State Legislative Assembly
Year	Constituency	Candidate	Votes	Pct	Opponent(s)	Votes	Pct	Ballots cast	Majority	Turnout
2008	N26 Chembong	Zaifulbahri Idris (UMNO)	7,017	70.25%	Zakaria Dahlan (PAS)	2,994	29.75%	10,155	4,023	78.13%
2013	N26 Chembong	Zaifulbahri Idris (UMNO)	10,153	73.43%	Kamarol Ridzuan Mohd Zain (PAS)	3,673	26.57%	14,062	6,480	86.70%
2018	N26 Chembong	Zaifulbahri Idris (UMNO)	9,079	60.45%	Azizan Marzuki (BERSATU)	4,652	30.97%	15,330	4,427	84.60%
2018	N26 Chembong	Zaifulbahri Idris (UMNO)	9,079	60.45%	Rosmin Adam (PAS)	1,288	8.58%	15,330	4,427	84.60%
2023	N26 Chembong	Zaifulbahri Idris (UMNO)	11,261	61.92%	Bakly Baba (BERSATU)	6,926	38.08%	18,350	4,335	71.61%

== Honours ==
- Negeri Sembilan
  - Knight Commander of the Order of Loyalty to Negeri Sembilan (DPNS) – Dato' (2013)
  - Companion of the Order of Loyalty to Negeri Sembilan (DNS) (2011)
  - Recipient of the Meritorious Service Medal (PJK) (2005)
