= Abdul Samad Idris =

Former Malaysian politician

Yang Berbahagia Tan Sri Dato' Seri Utama Abdul Samad Idris PMN SPNS DPMJ JMN AMN PJK

Minister of Culture, Youth and Sports
- In office 1976–1980
- Preceded by: Ali Ahmad
- Succeeded by: Mokhtar Hashim

Member of the Malaysian Parliament for Jelebu
- In office 1978–1982
- Preceded by: Rais Yatim
- Succeeded by: Rais Yatim
- Majority: won uncontested (1978)

Member of the Malaysian Parliament for Kuala Pilah (Parliament suspended 13 May 1969 – 20 February 1971)
- In office 1969–1974
- Preceded by: Bahaman Samsudin
- Succeeded by: Mansor Othman
- Majority: 3,596 (1969) won uncontested (1974)

Personal details
- Born: 23 October 1923 Kampung Bukit Tempurung, Seri Menanti, Kuala Pilah, Negeri Sembilan, Federated Malay States, British Malaya (now Malaysia)
- Died: 16 October 2003 (aged 79) Kuala Lumpur, Malaysia
- Cause of death: Stroke
- Party: United Malays National Organisation (UMNO)
- Other political affiliations: Alliance Party; Barisan Nasional (BN)

Abdul Samad bin Idris (23 October 1923 – 16 October 2003) was a former Malaysian politician. He served as Minister of Culture, Youth and Sports from 1976 to 1980.

== Early life ==
Abdul Samad was born in Kampung Bukit Tempurung, Seri Menanti, Kuala Pilah, Negeri Sembilan on 23 October 1923. He began writing in 1945 when he was a newspaper reporter of Majlis and Utusan Melayu.

== Death ==
Abdul Samad Idris died on 16 October 2003 at Kuala Lumpur Hospital due to stroke.

== Election results ==
Negeri Sembilan State Legislative Assembly
Year	Constituency	Candidate	Votes	Pct	Opponent(s)	Votes	Pct	Ballots cast	Majority	Turnout
1955	Johol	Abdul Samad Idris (UMNO)	Unopposed							
1959	N01 Seri Menanti	Abdul Samad Idris (UMNO)	Unopposed							
1964	N01 Seri Menanti	Abdul Samad Idris (UMNO)	Unopposed							

Parliament of Malaysia
Year	Constituency	Candidate	Votes	Pct	Opponent(s)	Votes	Pct	Ballots cast	Majority	Turnout
1969	P079 Kuala Pilah	Abdul Samad Idris (UMNO)	11,762	59.02%	Tunku Abdul Rahim Tunku Muda Chik (PAS)	8,166	40.98%	21,184	3,596	78.12%
1974	P092 Kuala Pilah	Abdul Samad Idris (UMNO)	Unopposed							
1978	P089 Jelebu	Abdul Samad Idris (UMNO)	Unopposed							

== Honours ==
- Malaya
  - Member of the Order of the Defender of the Realm (AMN) (1958)
- Malaysia
  - Companion of the Order of the Defender of the Realm (JMN) (1967)
  - Commander of the Order of the Defender of the Realm (PMN) – Tan Sri (1981)
- Johor
  - Knight Commander of the Order of the Crown of Johor (DPMJ) – Dato' (1979)
- Negeri Sembilan
  - Recipient of the Meritorious Service Medal (PJK)
  - Dato Setia Diwangsa (1967)
  - Knight Grand Commander of the Order of Loyalty to Negeri Sembilan (SPNS) – Dato' Seri Utama (1985)
