= Mohd Razi Mohd Ali =

Malaysian politician

Yang Berhormat Dato' Mohd Razi Mohd Ali DBNS DNS PMC MLA
- محمد راضي محمد علي

Member of the Negeri Sembilan State Legislative Assembly for Sungai Lui
- Incumbent
- Assumed office 5 May 2013
- Preceded by: Zainal Abidin Ahmad (BN–UMNO)
- Majority: 5,990 (2013); 4,399 (2018); 535 (2023)

Personal details
- Born: Mohd Razi bin Mohd Ali; 1 April 1973 (age 53) Malaysia
- Party: United Malays National Organisation (UMNO)
- Other political affiliations: Barisan Nasional (BN)
- Occupation: Politician

Mohd Razi bin Mohd Ali (born 1 April 1973) is a Malaysian politician who has served as Member of the Negeri Sembilan State Legislative Assembly (MLA) for Sungai Lui since May 2013. He is a member of the United Malays National Organisation (UMNO), a component party of the Barisan Nasional (BN) coalition.

== Election results ==
Negeri Sembilan State Legislative Assembly
Year	Constituency	Candidate	Votes	Pct	Opponent(s)	Votes	Pct	Ballots cast	Majority	Turnout
2013	N03 Sungai Lui	Mohd Razi Mohd Ali (UMNO)	9,029	74.82%	Nor Anif Selamat (PAS)	3,039	25.18%	12,408	5,990	85.44%
2018	N03 Sungai Lui	Mohd Razi Mohd Ali (UMNO)	7,795	62.56%	Zainal Fikri Abd Kadir (PKR)	3,396	27.26%	12,783	4,399	81.22%
2018	N03 Sungai Lui	Mohd Razi Mohd Ali (UMNO)	7,795	62.56%	Abdul Karim Shahimi Abdul Razak (PAS)	1,269	10.18%	12,783	4,399	81.22%
2023	N03 Sungai Lui	Mohd Razi Mohd Ali (UMNO)	6,939	52.00%	Mohammad Nordin Hashim (PAS)	6,404	48.00%	13,598	535	67.30%

== Honours ==
- Negeri Sembilan
  - Knight of the Order of Loyal Service to Negeri Sembilan (DBNS) – Dato' (2024)
  - Companion of the Order of Loyalty to Negeri Sembilan (DNS) (2014)
  - Recipient of the Medal for Outstanding Public Service (PMC) (2011)
