= Adnan Abu Hassan =

Adnan Abu Hassan may refer to:

- Adnan Abu Hassan (composer)
- Adnan Abu Hassan (politician)
