= 2023 Negeri Sembilan state election =

Malaysian state legislative election

- 12 August 2023

All 36 seats in the Negeri Sembilan State Legislative Assembly 19 seats needed for a majority
- Registered: 864,279
- Turnout: 68.35%
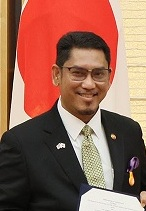
	Majority party	Minority party
	PH-BN
Leader	Aminuddin Harun; Jalaluddin Alias	Ahmad Faizal Azumu
Party	PKR; UMNO	BERSATU
Alliance	Pakatan Harapan; Barisan Nasional Parties: PKR; DAP; AMANAH; UMNO	Perikatan Nasional Parties: BERSATU; PAS; GERAKAN
Leader since	30 August 2017; 22 March 2023	31 May 2023
Leader's seat	Aminuddin: Sikamat; Jalaluddin: Pertang	Did not stand
Last election	36 seats, 86.05% (Note: Cooperation between PH and BN with 20 seats and 16 seats)	0 seats, 13.31% (Note: New coalition formed in 2020. These numbers are the total seats and vote share of BERSATU, PAS and GERAKAN in the last election. The parties were previously part of Pakatan Harapan, Gagasan Sejahtera and Barisan Nasional.)
Seats before	36	0
Seats won	31	5
Seat change	▼5	▲5
Popular vote	354,728	219,303
Percentage	60.90%	37.65%
Swing	▼25.15%	▲24.34%
- Results by constituency
Menteri Besar of Negeri Sembilan before election
Aminuddin Harun
PH
Menteri Besar of Negeri Sembilan after election
Aminuddin Harun
PH-BN coalition

The 15th Negeri Sembilan state election was held on 12 August 2023 to elect the State Assembly members of the 15th Negeri Sembilan State Legislative Assembly, the legislature of the Malaysian state of Negeri Sembilan.

Negeri Sembilan is one of the states which did not dissolve simultaneously with Dewan Rakyat on 10 October 2022. It was decided by Pakatan Harapan on 15 October 2022.

The Barisan Nasional (BN) – Pakatan Harapan (PH) electoral pact won 31 of 36 seats, with PH winning 17 of those seats and BN winning 14 seats, despite being labelled as a 'hung assembly' by the Election Commission (as PH and BN both used their own logos, thus they're not classified as a single political party or alliance). The Perikatan Nasional (PN) coalition won the remaining 5 seats to become the main opposition in the state assembly.

== Background ==
On 6 August 2020, the Chief Minister of Penang, Chow Kon Yeow, reiterated his stance that all states that have a Pakatan Harapan government, including Negeri Sembilan, would not dissolve the state assemblies in order to coincide with a snap general election. This was because at the time, the Penang, Selangor and Negeri Sembilan state governments had a stable majority. The Pakatan Harapan leadership further emphasised that there would not be a dissolution of assembly in 2021 and 2022, citing various factors, such as the ongoing COVID-19 pandemic, the need for the state governments to complete a full term, and the possibility of various factors which might inconvenience people should the state elections be called at the wrong time, such as floods, ahead of the 2022 Malaysian general election.

== Constituencies ==
All 36 constituencies within Negeri Sembilan, which constitute the Negeri Sembilan State Legislative Assembly, were contested during the election.

Electoral map of Negeri Sembilan, showing all 36 constituencies

Breakdown of 2022 Malaysian general election result by state constituency in 2022, where PH in Red, PN in Blue-green and BN in blue

== Composition before dissolution ==
Government			Confidence and supply
PH			BN
20			16
11	6	3	15	1
DAP	PKR	AMANAH	UMNO	MIC

== Timeline ==
The key dates are listed below.

Date	Event
15 October 2022	Pakatan Harapan Presidential Council decided against dissolving the 14th Negeri Sembilan State Legislative Assembly.
1 July 2023	Dissolution of the Negeri Sembilan State Legislative Assembly.
5 July 2023	Issue of the Writ of Election
29 July 2023	Nomination Day
29 July–11 August 2023	Campaigning Period
8–11 August 2023	Early Polling Day For Postal, Overseas and Advance Voters
12 August 2023	Polling Day

== Departing incumbents ==
The following members of the 14th State Legislative Assembly retired.

No.	State Constituency	Departing MLA	Coalition (Party)	Date confirmed	First elected	Reason
N17	Senaling	Adnan Abu Hassan	BN (UMNO)	8 May 2023	2013	Not contesting state election (MP for Kuala Pilah)
N35	Gemencheh	Mohd Isam Mohd Isa	BN (UMNO)	8 May 2023	2013	Not contesting state election (MP for Tampin)
N5	Serting	Shamshulkahar Mohd Deli	BN (UMNO)	21 July 2023	2008	Not contesting state election (MP for Jempol).
N2	Pertang	Noor Azmi Yusuf	BN (UMNO)	21 July 2023	2018	Dropped by party.
N16	Seri Menanti	Abdul Samad Ibrahim	BN (UMNO)	21 July 2023	2008	Dropped by party.
N28	Kota	Awaludin Said	BN (UMNO)	21 July 2023	2004	Dropped by party.
N31	Bagan Pinang	Tun Hairuddin Abu Bakar	BN (UMNO)	21 July 2023	2013	Dropped by party.
N32	Linggi	Abd Rahman Mohd Redza	BN (UMNO)	21 July 2023	2013	Dropped by party.
N7	Jeram Padang	Manickam Letchuman	BN (MIC)	5 July 2023	2013	Incumbent's party not contesting state election.
N18	Pilah	Mohamad Nazaruddin Sabtu	PH (PKR)	22 July 2023	2018	Dropped by party.
N29	Chuah	Yek Diew Ching	PH (PKR)	22 July 2023	2018	Dropped by party.
N33	Sri Tanjung	Ravi Munusamy	PH (PKR)	22 July 2023	2013	Dropped by party.
N22	Rahang	Mary Josephine Pritam Singh	PH (DAP)	23 July 2023	2013	Retired.
N9	Lenggeng	Suhaimi Kassim	PH (AMANAH)	21 July 2023	2018	Swapped seat allocation with BN.
N29	Paroi	Mohamad Taufek Abd. Ghani	PH (AMANAH)	23 July 2023	2008	Dropped by party.

== Electoral candidates ==
Names in bold are the confirmed winners in the 2023 state election.

No.	Parliament Constituency	No.	State Constituency	Voters	Incumbent State Assemblymen	Coalition (Party)	Political coalitions and parties									
No.	Parliament Constituency	No.	State Constituency	Voters	Incumbent State Assemblymen	Coalition (Party)	Barisan Nasional + Pakatan Harapan (perpaduaan {electoral pact})		Perikatan Nasional		MUDA + PSM electoral pact		Other parties/Independents			
No.	Parliament Constituency	No.	State Constituency	Voters	Incumbent State Assemblymen	Coalition (Party)	Candidate name	Party	Candidate name	Party	Candidate name	Party	Candidate name	Party	Candidate name	Party
P126	Jelebu	N01	Chennah	14,554	Anthony Loke Siew Fook	**PH** (**DAP**)	**Anthony Loke Siew Fook**	DAP	Rosmadi Arif	BERSATU						
P126	Jelebu	N02	Pertang	12,897	Noor Azmi Yusuf	**BN** (**UMNO**)	**Jalaluddin Alias**	UMNO	Amiruddin Hassan	PAS						
P126	Jelebu	N03	Sungai Lui	20,206	Mohd Razi Mohd Ali	**BN** (**UMNO**)	**Mohd Razi Mohd Ali**	UMNO	Mohammad Nordin Hashim	PAS						
P126	Jelebu	N04	Klawang	13,163	Bakri Sawir	**PH** (**AMANAH**)	**Bakri Sawir**	AMANAH	Danni Rais	BERSATU			Saiful Bahri Jaaman	IND		
P127	Jempol	N05	Serting	30,287	Shamshulkahar Mohd Deli	**BN** (**UMNO**)	Zamri Omar	UMNO	**Mohammad Fairuz Mohammad Isa**	PAS						
P127	Jempol	N06	Palong	23,494	Mustafa Nagoor	**BN** (**UMNO**)	**Mustafa Nagoor**	UMNO	Noor Azman Parmin	BERSATU						
P127	Jempol	N07	Jeram Padang	16,332	Manickam Letchuman	**BN** (**MIC**)	**Mohd Zaidy Abdul Kadir**	UMNO	S Suresh	BERSATU						
P127	Jempol	N08	Bahau	25,769	Teo Kok Seong	**PH** (**DAP**)	**Teo Kok Seong**	DAP	Kumar S Paramasivam	PAS						
P128	Seremban	N09	Lenggeng	27,386	Suhaimi Kassim	**PH** (**AMANAH**)	**Mohd Asna Amin**	UMNO	Mohammad Fadhli Che Me	PAS			Zul Azki Mat Sulop	IND		
P128	Seremban	N10	Nilai	42,168	Arul Kumar Jambunathan	**PH** (**DAP**)	**Arul Kumar Jambunathan**	DAP	Gan Chee Biow	BERSATU			Omar Mohd Isa	IND	Yessu Samuel	**IND**
P128	Seremban	N11	Lobak	23,193	Chew Seh Yong	**PH** (**DAP**)	**Chew Seh Yong**	DAP	Ng Soon Lean	GERAKAN						
P128	Seremban	N12	Temiang	13,085	Ng Chin Tsai	**PH** (**DAP**)	**Ng Chin Tsai**	DAP	Chang Er Chu	GERAKAN	Ahmad Qusyairi Abdul Rahim	**MUDA**				
P128	Seremban	N13	Sikamat	32,343	Aminuddin Harun	**PH** (**PKR**)	**Aminuddin Harun**	PKR	Ahmad Raihan Muhamad Hilal	BERSATU			Bujang Abu	IND	Mohammed Hafiz Baharudin	**IND**
P128	Seremban	N14	Ampangan	20,992	Mohamad Rafie Abdul Malek	**PH** (**PKR**)	**Tengku Zamrah Tengku Sulaiman**	PKR	Muhammad Ghazali Zainal Abidin	BERSATU			Mohamad Rafie Abdul Malek	IND		
P129	Kuala Pilah	N15	Juasseh	13,408	Ismail Lasim	**BN** (**UMNO**)	**Bibi Sharliza Mohd Khalid**	UMNO	Eddin Syazlee Shith	BERSATU						
P129	Kuala Pilah	N16	Seri Menanti	10,045	Abdul Samad Ibrahim	**BN** (**UMNO**)	**Muhammad Sufian Maradzi**	UMNO	Jamali Salam	BERSATU						
P129	Kuala Pilah	N17	Senaling	9,886	Adnan Abu Hasan	**BN** (**UMNO**)	**Ismail Lasim**	UMNO	Amrina Mohammad Khalid	BERSATU						
P129	Kuala Pilah	N18	Pilah	17,692	Mohamad Nazaruddin Sabtu	**PH** (**PKR**)	**Noorzunita Begum Abdullah**	PKR	Rafie Mustafa	PAS						
P129	Kuala Pilah	N19	Johol	12,313	Saiful Yazan Sulaiman	**BN** (**UMNO**)	**Saiful Yazan Sulaiman**	UMNO	Kamaruddin Mat Tahir	PAS						
P130	Rasah	N20	Labu	30,478	Ismail Ahmad	**PH** (**PKR**)	Ismail Ahmad	PKR	**Mohamad Hanifah Abu Baker**	BERSATU						
P130	Rasah	N21	Bukit Kepayang	46,229	Nicole Tan Lee Koon	**PH** (**DAP**)	**Nicole Tan Lee Koon**	DAP	Subramaniam Purusothama	BERSATU			Ahmad Zamali Mohamad	IND		
P130	Rasah	N22	Rahang	20,182	Mary Josephine Pritam Singh	**PH** (**DAP**)	**Siau Meow Kong**	DAP	Lee Boon Shian	GERAKAN						
P130	Rasah	N23	Mambau	28,952	Yap Yew Weng	**PH** (**DAP**)	**Yap Yew Weng**	DAP	Satesh Kumar Nillamiam	BERSATU			Kumaravel Ramiah	IND		
P130	Rasah	N24	Seremban Jaya	32,290	Gunasekaren Palasamy	**PH** (**DAP**)	**Gunasekaran Palasamy**	DAP	Gary Lee Ban Fatt	GERAKAN						
P131	Rembau	N25	Paroi	60,704	Mohamad Taufek Abd. Ghani	**PH** (**AMANAH**)	Norwani Ahmad	AMANAH	**Kamarol Ridzwan Mohammad Zin**	PAS			Syakir Fitri	IND		
P131	Rembau	N26	Chembong	25,625	Zaifulbahri Idris	**BN** (**UMNO**)	**Zaifulbahri Idris**	UMNO	Bakly Baba	BERSATU						
P131	Rembau	N27	Rantau	32,890	Mohamad Hasan	**BN** (**UMNO**)	**Mohamad Hasan**	UMNO	Rozmal Malakan	PAS						
P131	Rembau	N28	Kota	16,510	Awaludin Said	**BN** (**UMNO**)	**Suhaimi Aini**	UMNO	Ahmad Shukri Abdul Shukur	BERSATU						
P132	Port Dickson	N29	Chuah	15,095	Yek Diew Ching	**PH** (**PKR**)	**Yew Boon Lye**	PKR	Tang Jay Son	GERAKAN						
P132	Port Dickson	N30	Lukut	26,806	Choo Ken Hwa	**PH** (**DAP**)	**Choo Ken Hwa**	DAP	Ragoo Subramaniam	PAS						
P132	Port Dickson	N31	Bagan Pinang	27,790	Tun Hairuddin Abu Bakar	**BN** (**UMNO**)	Mohd Najib Mohd Isa	UMNO	**Abdul Fatah Zakaria**	PAS						
P132	Port Dickson	N32	Linggi	20,696	Abd Rahman Mohd Redza	**BN** (**UMNO**)	**Mohd Faizal Ramli**	UMNO	Zambri Mat Said	PAS						
P132	Port Dickson	N33	Sri Tanjung	19,431	Ravi Munusamy	**PH** (**PKR**)	**Rajasekaran Gunasekaran**	PKR	Zabidi Ariffin	BERSATU						
P133	Tampin	N34	Gemas	29,648	Abdul Razak Said	**BN** (**UMNO**)	Abdul Razak Said	UMNO	**Ridzuan Ahmad**	BERSATU						
P133	Tampin	N35	Gemencheh	24,602	Mohd Isam Mohd Isa	**BN** (**UMNO**)	**Suhaimizan Bizar**	UMNO	Tengku Abdullah Tengku Rakhman	PAS						
P133	Tampin	N36	Repah	27,284	Veerapan Superamaniam	**PH** (**DAP**)	**Veerapan Superamaniam**	DAP	Yong Li Yi	GERAKAN						

== Opinion polls ==
Polling firm	Dates conducted	Sample size	PH+BN	PN	Oth	Lead	Ref
Ilham Centre	29 July – 8 August 2023	2,304	57%	24%	19%	PH+BN +33%	
Merdeka Center	3 – 14 July 2023	1,005	59%	18%	22%	PH+BN +37%	

== Results ==
Results of the August 2023 Negeri Sembilan state election, by party.

Party or alliance		Votes	%	Seats	+/–
Pakatan Harapan + Barisan Nasional	Democratic Action Party	150,843	25.90	11	0
Pakatan Harapan + Barisan Nasional	United Malays National Organisation	129,548	22.24	14	–2
Pakatan Harapan + Barisan Nasional	People's Justice Party	51,438	8.83	5	–1
Pakatan Harapan + Barisan Nasional	National Trust Party	22,899	3.93	1	–2
Pakatan Harapan + Barisan Nasional	Total	354,728	60.90	31	–5
Perikatan Nasional	Malaysian Islamic Party	94,269	16.18	3	+3
Perikatan Nasional	Malaysian United Indigenous Party	106,295	18.25	2	+2
Perikatan Nasional	Parti Gerakan Rakyat Malaysia	18,739	3.22	0	0
Perikatan Nasional	Total	219,303	37.65	5	+5
Malaysian United Democratic Alliance		640	0.11	0	New
Independents		7,784	1.34	0	0
Total		582,455	100.00	36	–

=== By parliamentary constituency ===
PH+BN won all 8 parliamentary constituency by average percentages.

No.	Constituency	Pakatan Harapan + Barisan Nasional	Perikatan Nasional	Member of Parliament
P126	Jelebu	57.11%	41.99%	Jalaluddin Alias
P127	Jempol	57.48%	42.72%	Shamshulkahar Mohd. Deli
P128	Seremban	61.32%	33.24%	Anthony Loke Siew Fook
P129	Kuala Pilah	55.05%	44.96%	Adnan Abu Hassan
P130	Rasah	74.02%	24.96%	Cha Kee Chin
P131	Rembau	53.77%	44.32%	Mohamad Hasan
P132	Port Dickson	62.75%	37.25%	Aminuddin Harun
P133	Tampin	55.00%	45.00%	Mohd Isam Mohd Isa

=== Seats that changed allegiance ===
No.	Seat	Previous Party (2018)	Current Party (2023)
N05	Serting	Barisan Nasional (UMNO)	Perikatan Nasional (PAS)
N07	Jeram Padang	Barisan Nasional (MIC)	Barisan Nasional (UMNO)
N09	Lenggeng	Pakatan Harapan (AMANAH)	Barisan Nasional (UMNO)
N20	Labu	Pakatan Harapan (PKR)	Perikatan Nasional (BERSATU)
N25	Paroi	Pakatan Harapan (AMANAH)	Perikatan Nasional (PAS)
N31	Bagan Pinang	Barisan Nasional (UMNO)	Perikatan Nasional (PAS)
N35	Gemas	Barisan Nasional (UMNO)	Perikatan Nasional (BERSATU)

== Aftermath ==
Aminuddin were sworn in as Menteri Besar for his second term in front of Yang Dipertuan Besar of Negeri Sembilan on 14 August. Ten EXCO members were sworn in on 24 August.
