= Adnan Abu Hassan (politician) =

Malaysian politician

Yang Berhormat Dato' Adnan Abu Hassan DBNS DNS ANS PMC MP
- عدنان أبو حسّان

Member of the Malaysian Parliament for Kuala Pilah
- Incumbent
- Assumed office 19 November 2022
- Preceded by: Eddin Syazlee Shith (PN–BERSATU)
- Majority: 6,483 (2022)

Member of the Negeri Sembilan State Legislative Assembly for Senaling
- In office 9 May 2018 – 12 August 2023
- Preceded by: Ismail Lasim (BN–UMNO)
- Succeeded by: Ismail Lasim (BN–UMNO)
- Majority: 972 (2018)

Member of the Negeri Sembilan State Legislative Assembly for Pilah
- In office 8 March 2008 – 5 May 2013
- Preceded by: Norhayati Omar (BN–UMNO)
- Succeeded by: Norhayati Omar (BN–UMNO)
- Majority: 1,258 (2008)

Personal details
- Born: Adnan bin Abu Hassan Kuala Pilah, Negeri Sembilan, Malaysia
- Citizenship: Malaysian
- Party: United Malays National Organisation (UMNO)
- Other political affiliations: Barisan Nasional (BN)
- Spouse: Ramadhawati Wahab
- Children: 5
- Occupation: Politician

Adnan bin Abu Hassan is a Malaysian politician who has served as the Member of Parliament (MP) for Kuala Pilah since November 2022. He served as the Member of the Negeri Sembilan State Legislative Assembly (MLA) for Senaling from May 2018 to August 2023 and for Pilah from March 2008 to May 2013. He is a member and the Deputy Division Chief of Kuala Pilah of the United Malays National Organisation (UMNO), a component party of the BN coalition.

== Election results ==
Negeri Sembilan State Legislative Assembly
Year	Constituency	Candidate	Votes	Pct	Opponent(s)	Votes	Pct	Ballots cast	Majority	Turnout
2008	N18 Pilah	Adnan Abu Hassan (UMNO)	4,359	58.43%	Asmaon Basir (PKR)	3,101	41.57%	7,680	1,258	73.05%
2018	N17 Senaling	Adnan Abu Hassan (UMNO)	3,456	52.86%	Md Rais Mohamad (AMANAH)	2,484	37.99%	6,678	972	82.70%
2018	N17 Senaling	Adnan Abu Hassan (UMNO)	3,456	52.86%	Fazilah Abu Samah (PAS)	598	9.15%	6,678	972	82.70%

Parliament of Malaysia
Year	Constituency	Candidate	Votes	Pct	Opponent(s)	Votes	Pct	Ballots cast	Majority	Turnout
2022	P129 Kuala Pilah	Adnan Abu Hassan (UMNO)	21,423	44.02%	Nor Azman Mohamad (PKR)	14,940	30.70%	49,371	6,483	76.94%
2022	P129 Kuala Pilah	Adnan Abu Hassan (UMNO)	21,423	44.02%	Eddin Syazlee Shith (BERSATU)	11,560	23.76%	49,371	6,483	76.94%
2022	P129 Kuala Pilah	Adnan Abu Hassan (UMNO)	21,423	44.02%	Kamarulzaman Kamdias (PUTRA)	406	0.83%	49,371	6,483	76.94%
2022	P129 Kuala Pilah	Adnan Abu Hassan (UMNO)	21,423	44.02%	Azman Idris (WARISAN)	333	0.68%	49,371	6,483	76.94%

== Honours ==
=== Honours of Malaysia ===
- Malaysia
  - Recipient of the 17th Yang di-Pertuan Agong Installation Medal (2024)
- Negeri Sembilan
  - Knight of the Order of Loyal Service to Negeri Sembilan (DBNS) – Dato' (2016)
  - Companion of the Order of Loyalty to Negeri Sembilan (DNS) (2010)
  - Member of the Order of Loyalty to Negeri Sembilan (ANS) (2006)
  - Recipient of the Medal for Outstanding Public Service (PMC) (2005)
