= Order of precedence in Negeri Sembilan =

Relative preeminence of officials for ceremonial purposes

The Negeri Sembilan order of precedence is a nominal and symbolic hierarchy of important positions within the state of Negeri Sembilan. It has no legal standing but is used to dictate ceremonial protocol at events of a state nature.

== Order of precedence ==
Order of precedence in Negeri Sembilan is as follows:

No.	Description
1	His Royal Highness The Yang di-Pertuan Besar
2	Her Royal Highness The Tunku Ampuan Besar
3	The Undang of Sungei Ujong; The Undang of Jelebu; The Undang of Johol; The Undang of Rembau; The Tunku Besar of Tampin
3A	The former Tunku Ampuan
3B	The Prime Minister
3C	The Deputy Prime Minister
4	The Menteri Besar
5	The Dato' Shahbandar; The Tunku Besar of Seri Menanti
6A	Federal Ministers
6B	The Tunku Laksamana; The Tunku Muda of Serting; The Tunku Panglima Besar
6C	Tun
7	Speaker of the Legislative Assembly
8	The Judges
9	Federal Deputy Ministers
10	Former Menteris Besar (ordered by departure from office): 1. Dr. Rais Yatim (29 April 1982); 2. Mohd. Isa Abdul Samad (25 March 2004); 3. Mohamad Hasan MLA (12 May 2018)
11	Members of the Executive Council
12	Mufti
13	State Police Chief; Senior military officers (ranked brigadier general and above)
14	The Dato' Kurnia
14A	Tan Sri
15	Members of the Legislative Assembly
16	Members of the House of Representatives
17	Senators
18	Head of offices equivalent to Grade 48 to 51; Head of offices equivalent to Grade 45 to 47; District Officers; Clerk of the Royal Court; Senior Administrative Officers
19	Non-leading senior officers
20	Head of Division 1 Offices
21	Companions of the Most Esteemed Order of Loyalty to Negeri Sembilan (DSN); Members of the Distinguished Conduct Medal (PPT)
22	Justices of the Peace

== See also ==
- List of post-nominal letters (Negeri Sembilan)
