= Laws of the Constitution of Negeri Sembilan 1959 =

Constitution of the state of Negeri Sembilan, Malaysia

The Laws of the Constitution of Negeri Sembilan 1959
- The coat of arms of Negeri Sembilan

Overview
- Original title: Undang-Undang Tubuh Kerajaan Negeri Sembilan 1959
- Jurisdiction: Negeri Sembilan, Malaysia
- Subordinate to: Federal Constitution of Malaysia
- Ratified: 26 March 1959
- Date effective: 18 April 1959
- System: Parliamentary democracy Constitutional monarchy Elective monarchy

Government structure
- Branches: Two (Legislative and Executive)
- Head of state: Yang di-Pertuan Besar
- Chambers: Unicameral
- Executive: State Executive Council
- Signatories: Tuanku Abdul Rahman (Yang di-Pertuan Besar); Dato Klana Petra (Undang of Sungai Ujong); Shahmaruddin Dato Mendika Menteri Akhirzaman (Undang of Jelebu); Abdul Manap Dato Johan Pahlawan Lela Perkasa Setiawan (Undang of Johol); Dato Lela Maharaja (Undang of Rembau); Tengku Syed Idrus (Tengku Besar of Tampin)
- Supersedes: First Part of the Laws of the Constitution of Negeri Sembilan 1948

Footnote
- Full text of The Laws of the Constitution of Negeri Sembilan 1959

The Laws of the Constitution of Negeri Sembilan 1959 is the constitution of the state of Negeri Sembilan in Malaysia and establishes the state as a constitutional monarchy with the Yang di-Pertuan Besar of Negeri Sembilan as its head of state. It also laid down the fundamental structure and machinery of government in Negeri Sembilan, such as the state executive council and the state legislative assembly. It came into force in March 1959 following the independence of Federation of Malaya in 1957.

== History ==
The Laws of the Constitution of Negeri Sembilan Part I was firstly introduced on 1 February 1948, following the formation of Federation of Malaya. Under the State Agreement, the Malay Rulers are required to promulgated their State Constitution of which are used to distinguish the legislative power from the executive power by constituting a legislative body. Since its introduction, the constitution underwent seven amendments.

Following Malaya's independence, a new constitution was approved by the Negeri Smebilan State Council on 26 March 1959, before the legislative body was dissolved on 18 April that year to pave way for the first general election in Malaya after independence.

The new state constitution was then signed by the Yang di-Pertuan Besar, the four Undangs, and the Tengku Besar of Tampin on 27 April 1959. It was proclaimed as The Laws of the Constitution of Negeri Sembilan 1959, which also revoked and replaced the First Part of the Laws of the Constitution of Negeri Sembilan 1948. The new constitution retrospectively took effect on 18 April 1959, the date of the dissolution of the last Council of State of Negeri Sembilan.

== Composition ==
The Constitution, in its current form (9 October 2003), consists of 2 Parts, 17 chapters containing 84 articles and 1 schedule.

=== First Part ===
- Chapter 1 - Preliminary

Preliminary contains four articles; article 1 for short title and date of commencement, article 2 for First Part of the Laws of the Constitution, article 3 for saving of the First Part of the Constitution and article 4 for interpretation of the first part using the provisions of article 34 of the second part.

- Chapter 2 - Religion of the State

Chapter 2 contains two articles; article 5 and 6. It declares that the official religion of the state is Islam, and the Yang di-Pertuan Besar is to be the Head of Religion of Islam. The Council of Religion of Islam (Majlis Agama Islam) is also established to advise him and the Ruling Chiefs (Undangs) on religious matter. It also provides that everyone in the state has the freedom to practice his own religion.

- Chapter 3 - Yang di-Pertuan Besar

Chapter 3 contains six articles; article 7 to 11. This chapter pertains to the Yang di-Pertuan Besar of Negeri Sembilan, including the qualifications of becoming the Yang di-Pertuan Besar, rules regarding the abdication of Yang di-Pertuan Besar and selection of new Yang di-Pertuan Besar by the four Undangs.

Under article 7, the Yang di-Pertuan Besar must be a male Malay Muslim, who is of sound mind and is lawfully-begotten descendent from the male line of Raja Radin ibni Raja Lenggang, and is elected by the Undangs. In article 9, the Yang di-Pertuan Besar may voluntarily abdicate from his throne if he wish so, and will receive a monthly allowance for life, unless he has done any treasonous act or carried out any anti-state activity.

Under article 10, the Undangs may, after a full and complete enquiry, temporarily suspend or permanently remove the Yang di-Pertuan Besar from the throne on grounds of insanity, blindness, dumbness, or qualities that are against the Hukum Syarak, or if he had done any overt act that is unbecoming of a monarch, or he had deliberately disregarded the state constitution. Afterwards, a proclamation signed by the Undangs and the Menteri Besar shall be issued to execute the said suspension or removal.

However, there is no court precendence or clear definition in the state constitution on what does "full and complete enquiry" entails, and article 10 is one of the contentious points during the 2026 Negeri Sembilan constitutional crisis.

Additionally, under article 10A, the Yang di-Pertuan Besar may also be suspended or removed from the throne if he has been charged or convicted of a crime and was sentenced to more than one day of imprisonment by the Special Court without receiving any free pardon. This article was inserted to the state constitution following the 1993 amendment to the Federal Constitution of Malaysia, which removed the legal immunity of all monarchs in Malaysia.

- Chapter 4 - Regency

Chapter 4 contains two articles; article 12 and 13. It addresses the conditions that requires a regency, the process of appointing a regent and the regents role in Conference of Rulers.

- Chapter 5 - The Rulling Chiefs

Chapter 5 contains two articles; article 14 and 15, respectively pertains to the Undangs of Sungai Ujong, Jelebu, Johol and Rembau, Tengku Besar of Tampin and the Dato Syahbandar of Sungai Ujong.

- Chapter 6 - Dewan Keadilan dan Undang

Chapter 6 contains ten articles; article 16 to 25. It addresses the functions of Dewan Keadilan dan Undang (The Council of the Yang di-Pertuan Besar and the Rulling Chiefs), the appointment of its members, and rules regarding the council's proceedings. The main functions of the Dewan is to advise on questions of Malay customs in the state, which also includes the election or removal of the Undangs.

- Chapter 7 - Honours and Dignities

Chapter 7 contains two articles; article 26 to 27. This chapter pertains to the Yang di-Pertuan Besar's role as the fountain of honours and dignity. It addresses the Yang di-Pertuan Besar's powers in giving honours, and the power to degrade any rank or title he had conferred.

- Chapter 8 - General Provisions

Chapter 8 contains five articles; article 28 to 32.

- Article 28 pertains to subjection of Yang di-Pertuan Besar and the Undangs to article 40 of the second part of the constitution.
- Article 29 pertains to Exercise of powers and duties by Undangs
- Article 30 pertains to Order of precedence
- Article 31 pertains to State Emblem, Insignia of Royalty, Yang di-Pertuan Besar's Standard and the Flag of the State
- Article 32 pertains to preservation of State Ancient constitution and ancient custom.

=== Second Part ===
- Chapter 1 - Preliminary

Part 2 Preliminary consists of two articles; article 33 for second part of the Laws and article 34 for interpretation of the terminologies used by the Yang di-Pertuan Besar and the Rulling Chiefs, and the State Government and its organs and servants.

- Chapter 2 - Executive

This chapter contains eleven articles; article 35 to 44. It pertains to executive authority power of the Yang di-Pertuan Besar, the process of appointment of Menteri Besar of Negeri Sembilan, State Secretary, Legal Advisor, Financial Officer, and the members of Negeri Sembilan State Executive Council and rules regarding the proceedings of the council.

- Chapter 3 - The Power of Pardon

This chapter contains one article; article 45. It addresses the power of Yang di-Pertuan Besar to give pardon, reprieve or respite to convicted criminals that carries out crime in the state. It also pertains to the Pardon Board, its membership and its role.

- Chapter 4 - Capacity of the State

This chapter contains one article; article 46. It addresses the capacity of the state to acquire, hold or dispose of property of any kind, and to sue or be sued.

- Chapter 5 - The Legislature

This chapter contains twenty two articles; article 47 to 68. It pertains to the Negeri Sembilan State Legislative Assembly, its memberships, summoning, prorogation and dissolution, Speaker election, roles, and proceedings.

- Chapter 6 - Finance

This chapter contains six articles; article 69 to 74. It addresses financial issues and the budget.

- Chapter 7 - General Provisions

This chapter contains six articles; article 75 to 79. Article 75 pertains to the special position of the Malays and the Yang di-Pertuan Besar's role of safeguarding it. Article 76 provides that there shall be impartial treatment towards any state employees regardless of their races. Article 77 describes the appearance of the Public Seal of the State of Negeri Sembilan and its functions. Article 78 and 78A pertains to the mechanisms and procedures related to amending the Constitution and reprinting procedure of the Constitution and its authoritative text. Article 79 - The Royal Prerogatives, provides that the Constitution shall not affect the prerogatives, powers and jurisdiction of the Yang di-Pertuan Besar and the rulling chiefs.

- Chapter 8 - Transitional Provisions

This chapter contains one article; article 80. It addresses the membership of the interim or caretaker State Executive Council after the dissolution of last State Council on 18 April 1959. It dictated that members of the State Executive Council can continue to hold their respective office during the interim period until the election of the first State Legislative Assembly, and may continue to hold such office if they were subsequently elected to the new Legislative Assembly.

- Chapter 9 - Revocation

This chapter contains one article; article 81. It addresses the revocation of the First part of the Laws of the Constitution of Negeri Sembilan previously in force since 1948.

=== Schedule ===
Forms of Oaths and Affirmations

- Part 1: Oath of Member of State Executive Council
- Part 2: Oath of Member of State Legislative Assembly
- Part 3: Oath of Officials taking part in the proceedings of the State Executive Council
- Part 4: Oath of a Political Secretary

== See also ==
- Federal Constitution of Malaysia
- Yang di-Pertuan Besar of Negeri Sembilan
- Menteri Besar of Negeri Sembilan
- Negeri Sembilan State Legislative Assembly
- Negeri Sembilan State Executive Council
