= Sungai Lui =

Political subdivision in Malaysia

Sungai Lui (N03)
Negeri Sembilan constituency

State constituency
- Legislature: Negeri Sembilan State Legislative Assembly
MLA
Mohd Razi Mohd Ali
BN
- Constituency created: 1984
- First contested: 1986
- Last contested: 2026

Demographics
- Electors (2023): 20,206

N03 Sungai Lui within Negeri Sembilan, as used for the 2023 and 2026 state elections

Sungai Lui (English: Lui River) is a state constituency in Negeri Sembilan, Malaysia, that has been represented in the Negeri Sembilan State Legislative Assembly.

The state constituency was first contested in 1986 and is mandated to return a single Assemblyman to the Negeri Sembilan State Legislative Assembly under the first-past-the-post voting system.

== Demographics ==
Ethnic breakdown of Sungai Lui's electorate as of 2026
1. Malay (79.8%)
2. Indian (8.10%)
3. Other ethnicities (6.40%)
4. Chinese (5.70%)

== History ==
=== Polling districts ===
According to the gazette issued on 23 July 2026, the Sungai Lui constituency has a total of 11 polling districts.

State constituency	Polling districts	Code	Location
Sungai Lui (N03)	Sungai Lui	126/03/01	SK Sungai Lui
Sungai Lui (N03)	Lui Timor	126/03/02	SK Lui Timor
Sungai Lui (N03)	Lui Muda	126/03/03	SK (FELDA) Lui Muda
Sungai Lui (N03)	Lui Selatan	126/03/04	SK (FELDA) Lui Selatan
Sungai Lui (N03)	Pulapol Ayer Hitam	126/03/05	SK Pulapah
Sungai Lui (N03)	Ladang Ayer Hitam	126/03/06	SJK (T) Ladang Air Hitam
Sungai Lui (N03)	Kampong Bahru Ayer Hitam	126/03/07	SK Ayer Hitam
Sungai Lui (N03)	Lui Barat	126/03/08	SMK (FELDA) Lui Barat
Sungai Lui (N03)	Pasoh 3	126/03/09	SK (FELDA) Pasoh 3
Sungai Lui (N03)	Pasoh 2	126/03/10	SK (FELDA) Pasoh 2
Sungai Lui (N03)	Kampung Serampang Indah	126/03/11	SK Sungai Sampo

=== Representation history ===
Members of Assembly for Sungai Lui
Assembly	No	Years	Name	Party
Constituency split from Bahau
7th	N04	1986-1990	Abdul Muhi Abdul Wahab	BN (UMNO)
8th	N04	1990-1995	Anuar Rasidin @ Rashidin	BN (UMNO)
9th	N04	1995-1999	Anuar Rasidin @ Rashidin	BN (UMNO)
10th	N04	1999-2004	Anuar Rasidin @ Rashidin	BN (UMNO)
11th	N03	2004-2008	Zainal Abidin Ahmad	BN (UMNO)
12th	N03	2008-2013	Zainal Abidin Ahmad	BN (UMNO)
13th	N03	2013-2018	Mohd Razi Mohd Ali	BN (UMNO)
14th	N03	2018-2023	Mohd Razi Mohd Ali	BN (UMNO)
15th	N03	2023–2026	Mohd Razi Mohd Ali	BN (UMNO)
16th	N03	2026–present	Mohd Razi Mohd Ali	BN (UMNO)

== Election results ==
Negeri Sembilan state election, 2026: Sungai Lui
Party	Candidate	Votes	%	∆%
BN	Mohd Razi Mohd Ali	11,273	78.30	▲26.30
PH	Zainal Fikri Abd Kadir	2,807	19.50	▲19.50
BERSATU	Nazrulhisham Abdul Mansor	317	2.20	▲2.20
Total valid votes		14,397	100.00	
Total rejected ballots		210		
Unreturned ballots		18		
Turnout		14,625	74.30	▲6.91
Registered electors		19,684		
Majority		8,466	58.80	▲54.80
BN hold		Swing		

Negeri Sembilan state election, 2023: Sungai Lui
Party	Candidate	Votes	%	∆%
BN	Mohd Razi Mohd Ali	6,939	52.00	▼9.44
PN	Mohd Nordin Hashim	6,404	48.00	▲48.00
Total valid votes		13,343	100.00	
Total rejected ballots		235		
Unreturned ballots		18		
Turnout		13,616	67.39	▼13.83
Registered electors		20,206		
Majority		535	4.00	▼31.3
BN hold		Swing		

Negeri Sembilan state election, 2018: Sungai Lui
Party	Candidate	Votes	%	∆%
BN	Mohd Razi Mohd Ali	7,795	62.56	▼12.26
PH	Zainal Fikri Abd Kadir	3,396	27.26	▲27.26
PAS	Abdul Karim Shahimi Abdul Razak	1,269	10.18	▼15.00
Total valid votes		12,460	100.00	
Total rejected ballots		236		
Unreturned ballots		87		
Turnout		12,783	81.22	▼4.22
Registered electors		15,739		
Majority		4,399	35.30	▼14.34
BN hold		Swing		

Negeri Sembilan state election, 2013: Sungai Lui
Party	Candidate	Votes	%	∆%
BN	Mohd Razi Mohd Ali	9,029	74.82	▲1.06
PAS	Nor Anif Selamat	3,039	25.18	▼1.06
Total valid votes		12,068	100.00	
Total rejected ballots		284		
Unreturned ballots		56		
Turnout		12,408	85.44	▲6.42
Registered electors		14,523		
Majority		5,990	49.64	▲2.13
BN hold		Swing		

Negeri Sembilan state election, 2008: Sungai Lui
Party	Candidate	Votes	%	∆%
BN	Zainal Abidin Ahmad	6,791	73.75	▼4.11
PAS	Kateran Marman	2,416	26.24	▲4.11
Total valid votes		9,207	100.00	
Total rejected ballots		224		
Unreturned ballots		180		
Turnout		9,611	79.02	▲2.22
Registered electors		12,163		
Majority		4,375	47.51	▼8.21
BN hold		Swing		

Negeri Sembilan state election, 2004: Sungai Lui
Party	Candidate	Votes	%	∆%
BN	Zainal Abidin Ahmad	6,490	77.86	▼14.17
PAS	Norman Ipin	1,846	22.14	▲22.14
Total valid votes		8,336	100.00	
Total rejected ballots		271		
Unreturned ballots		0		
Turnout		8,607	76.80	▼8.67
Registered electors		11,207		
Majority		4,644	55.72	▲28.34
BN hold		Swing		

Negeri Sembilan state election, 1990: Sungai Lui
Party	Candidate	Votes	%	∆%
BN	Anuar Rasidin @ Rashidin	5,168	63.69	▼21.43
S46	Abdul Muhi Abdul Wahab	2,946	36.31	▲36.31
Total valid votes		8,114	100.00	
Total rejected ballots		242		
Unreturned ballots		0		
Turnout		8,356	85.47	▲6.72
Registered electors		9,777		
Majority		2,222	27.38	▼42.86
BN hold		Swing		

Negeri Sembilan state election, 1986: Sungai Lui
Party	Candidate	Votes	%
BN	Abdul Muhi Abdul Wahab	4,937	85.12
PAS	Bakhtiar Yusof	863	14.88
Total valid votes		5,800	100.00
Total rejected ballots		232	
Unreturned ballots		0	
Turnout		6,032	78.75
Registered electors		7,660	
Majority		4,074	70.24
Constitutency created.
