= Chembong (state constituency) =

State constituency in Negeri Sembilan, Malaysia

Chembong (N26)
Negeri Sembilan constituency

State constituency
- Legislature: Negeri Sembilan State Legislative Assembly
MLA
Zaifulbahri Idris
BN
- Constituency created: 1984
- First contested: 1986
- Last contested: 2026

Demographics
- Electors (2023): 25,625
- Area (km²): 193

N26 Chembong within Negeri Sembilan, as used for the 2023 and 2026 state elections

Chembong is a state constituency in Negeri Sembilan, Malaysia, that has been represented in the Negeri Sembilan State Legislative Assembly.

The state constituency was first contested in 1986 and is mandated to return a single Assemblyman to the Negeri Sembilan State Legislative Assembly under the first-past-the-post voting system.

== Demographics ==
Ethnic breakdown of Chembong's electorate as of 2026
1. Malay (82.0%)
2. Indian (9.70%)
3. Chinese (6.00%)
4. Other ethnicities (2.40%)

== History ==
=== Polling districts ===
According to the gazette issued on 23 July 2026, the Chembong constituency has a total of 12 polling districts.

| State constituency | Polling districts | Code | Location |
|---|---|---|---|
| Chembong (N26) | Ulu Pedas | 131/26/01 | SMA Dato Haji Abu Hassan Haji Sail |
| Chembong (N26) | Sepri | 131/26/02 | SK Sepri |
| Chembong (N26) | Kampong Rendah | 131/26/03 | SK Kayu Ara |
| Chembong (N26) | Kampong Senama Ulu | 131/26/04 | SK Taman Seri Rembau |
| Chembong (N26) | Chembong | 131/26/05 | SMK Dato' Sedia Raja |
| Chembong (N26) | Pekan Pedas | 131/26/06 | SJK (C) Pei Hwa Pedas |
| Chembong (N26) | Kampong Pedas Tengah | 131/26/07 | SK Pedas |
| Chembong (N26) | Pekan Rembau | 131/26/08 | SMK Undang Rembau; SJK (C) Yuk Hua Rembau |
| Chembong (N26) | Batu Hampar | 131/26/09 | SK Seberang Batu Hampar |
| Chembong (N26) | Mampong | 131/26/10 | SK Undang Rembau |
| Chembong (N26) | Pilin | 131/26/11 | UITM Cawangan Negeri Sembilan Kampus Rembau |
| Chembong (N26) | Kundor | 131/26/12 | SK Kundor |

=== Representation history ===
Members of the Legislative Assembly for Chembong
| Assembly | No | Years | Member | Party |
Constituency created from Kota and Terentang
| 7th | N25 | 1986-1990 | Mahzan Hamzah | BN (UMNO) |
| 8th | N25 | 1990-1995 | Mahzan Hamzah | BN (UMNO) |
| 9th | N28 | 1995-1999 | Firdaus Muhammad Rom Harun | BN (UMNO) |
| 10th | N28 | 1999-2004 | Firdaus Muhammad Rom Harun | BN (UMNO) |
| 11th | N26 | 2004-2008 | Muhammad Rais Zainuddin | BN (UMNO) |
| 12th | N26 | 2008-2013 | Zaifulbahri Idris | BN (UMNO) |
| 13th | N26 | 2013-2018 | Zaifulbahri Idris | BN (UMNO) |
| 14th | N26 | 2018–2023 | Zaifulbahri Idris | BN (UMNO) |
| 15th | N26 | 2023–2026 | Zaifulbahri Idris | BN (UMNO) |
| 16th | N26 | 2026–present | Zaifulbahri Idris | BN (UMNO) |

== Election results ==
Negeri Sembilan state election, 2026
| Party | Candidate | Votes | % | ∆% |
|---|---|---|---|---|
| BN | Zaifulbahri Idris | 17,160 | 83.48 | ▲21.56 |
| PH | Danish Nazran Murad | 3,397 | 16.52 | ▲16.52 |
| Total valid votes | | 20,557 | 100.00 | |
| Total rejected ballots | | 158 | | |
| Unreturned ballots | | 20 | | |
| Turnout | | 20,735 | 78.11 | ▲6.35 |
| Registered electors | | 26,547 | | |
| Majority | | 13,763 | 66.95 | ▲43.11 |
| BN hold | | Swing | | |

Negeri Sembilan state election, 2023
| Party | Candidate | Votes | % | ∆% |
|---|---|---|---|---|
| BN | Zaifulbahri Idris | 11,261 | 61.92 | ▲1.47 |
| PN | Bakly Baba | 6,926 | 38.08 | ▲38.08 |
| Total valid votes | | 18,187 | 100.00 | |
| Total rejected ballots | | 163 | | |
| Unreturned ballots | | 39 | | |
| Turnout | | 18,389 | 71.76 | ▼12.86 |
| Registered electors | | 25,625 | | |
| Majority | | 4,335 | 23.84 | ▼5.64 |
| BN hold | | Swing | | |

Negeri Sembilan state election, 2018
| Party | Candidate | Votes | % | ∆% |
|---|---|---|---|---|
| BN | Zaifulbahri Idris | 9,079 | 60.45 | ▼12.98 |
| PH | Azizan Marzuki | 4,652 | 30.97 | ▲30.97 |
| PAS | Rosmin Adam | 1,288 | 8.58 | ▼17.99 |
| Total valid votes | | 15,019 | 100.00 | |
| Total rejected ballots | | 213 | | |
| Unreturned ballots | | 98 | | |
| Turnout | | 15,330 | 84.62 | ▼1.68 |
| Registered electors | | 18,116 | | |
| Majority | | 4,427 | 29.48 | ▼17.38 |
| BN hold | | Swing | | |

Negeri Sembilan state election, 2013
| Party | Candidate | Votes | % | ∆% |
|---|---|---|---|---|
| BN | Zaifulbahri Idris | 10,153 | 73.43 | ▲2.99 |
| PAS | Kamarol Ridzuan Mohd Zain | 3,673 | 26.57 | ▼2.99 |
| Total valid votes | | 13,826 | 100.00 | |
| Total rejected ballots | | 230 | | |
| Unreturned ballots | | 0 | | |
| Turnout | | 14,056 | 86.30 | ▲8.17 |
| Registered electors | | 16,287 | | |
| Majority | | 6,480 | 46.86 | ▲5.98 |
| BN hold | | Swing | | |
Source(s) "Federal Government Gazette - Notice of Contested Election, State Legislative Assembly for the State of Negeri Sembilan [P.U. (B) 193/2013]" (PDF). Attorney General's Chambers of Malaysia. 26 April 2013. "Federal Government Gazette - Results of Contested Election and Statements of the Poll after the Official Addition of Votes, State Constituencies for the State of Negeri Sembilan [P.U. (B) 234/2013]" (PDF). Attorney General's Chambers of Malaysia. 22 May 2013.

Negeri Sembilan state election, 2008
| Party | Candidate | Votes | % | ∆% |
|---|---|---|---|---|
| BN | Zaifulbahri Idris | 7,017 | 70.44 | ▼10.27 |
| PAS | Zakaria Dahlan | 2,944 | 29.5 | ▲10.27 |
| Total valid votes | | 9,961 | 100.00 | |
| Total rejected ballots | | 175 | | |
| Unreturned ballots | | 19 | | |
| Turnout | | 10,155 | 78.13 | ▲3.08 |
| Registered electors | | 12,997 | | |
| Majority | | 4,073 | 40.89 | ▼20.53 |
| BN hold | | Swing | | |

Negeri Sembilan state election, 2004
| Party | Candidate | Votes | % | ∆% |
|---|---|---|---|---|
| BN | Mohamad Rais Zainuddin | 7,482 | 80.71 | ▲19.07 |
| PAS | Mokhtar Borhan | 1,788 | 19.29 | ▲19.29 |
| Total valid votes | | 9,270 | 100.00 | |
| Total rejected ballots | | 264 | | |
| Unreturned ballots | | 19 | | |
| Turnout | | 9,553 | 75.05 | ▲3.19 |
| Registered electors | | 12,728 | | |
| Majority | | 5,694 | 61.42 | ▲38.13 |
| BN hold | | Swing | | |

Negeri Sembilan state election, 1999
| Party | Candidate | Votes | % | ∆% |
|---|---|---|---|---|
| BN | Firdaus Muhammad Rom Harun | 4,343 | 61.65 | ▼31.79 |
| PKR | Ishak Md Sood | 2,702 | 38.35 | ▲38.35 |
| Total valid votes | | 7,045 | 100.00 | |
| Total rejected ballots | | 275 | | |
| Unreturned ballots | | 15 | | |
| Turnout | | 7,335 | 71.86 | ▲0.86 |
| Registered electors | | 10,207 | | |
| Majority | | 1,641 | 23.29 | ▼63.58 |
| BN hold | | Swing | | |

Negeri Sembilan state election, 1995
| Party | Candidate | Votes | % | ∆% |
|---|---|---|---|---|
| BN | Firdaus Muhammad Rom Harun | 6,347 | 93.43 | ▲12.56 |
| Independent | Abdul Wahab Ismail | 446 | 6.57 | ▲6.57 |
| Total valid votes | | 6,793 | 100.00 | |
| Total rejected ballots | | 233 | | |
| Unreturned ballots | | 21 | | |
| Turnout | | 7,047 | 71.00 | ▼3.34 |
| Registered electors | | 9,925 | | |
| Majority | | 5,901 | 86.87 | ▲25.13 |
| BN hold | | Swing | | |

Negeri Sembilan state election, 1990
| Party | Candidate | Votes | % | ∆% |
|---|---|---|---|---|
| BN | Mahzan Hamzah | 5,234 | 80.87 | ▼4.72 |
| S46 | Ahmad Yusof | 1,238 | 19.13 | ▲19.13 |
| Total valid votes | | 6,472 | 100.00 | |
| Total rejected ballots | | 278 | | |
| Unreturned ballots | | 20 | | |
| Turnout | | 6,770 | 74.35 | ▲4.38 |
| Registered electors | | 9,106 | | |
| Majority | | 3,996 | 61.74 | ▼13.33 |
| BN hold | | Swing | | |

Negeri Sembilan state election, 1986
| Party | Candidate | Votes | % |
|---|---|---|---|
| BN | Mahzan Hamzah | 4,982 | 85.59 |
| Independent | Zakaria Abu Hassan | 612 | 10.51 |
| NASMA | Salam Yunos | 227 | 3.90 |
| Total valid votes | | 5,821 | 100.00 |
| Total rejected ballots | | 276 | |
| Unreturned ballots | | 0 | |
| Turnout | | 6,097 | 69.97 |
| Registered electors | | 8,714 | |
| Majority | | 4,370 | 75.07 |
This was a new constituency created.
