= Chennah =

Malaysian state constituency

Chennah (N01)
Negeri Sembilan constituency

State constituency
- Legislature: Negeri Sembilan State Legislative Assembly
MLA
John Siow Kong Choon
BN
- Constituency created: 1994
- First contested: 1995
- Last contested: 2026

Demographics
- Electors (2023): 14,554

N01 Chennah within Negeri Sembilan, as used for the 2023 and 2026 state elections

Chennah is a state constituency in Negeri Sembilan, Malaysia, that has been represented in the Negeri Sembilan State Legislative Assembly.

The state constituency was first contested in 1995 and is mandated to return a single Assemblyman to the Negeri Sembilan State Legislative Assembly under the first-past-the-post voting system. At size around 720 km², it a largest state constituency in Negeri Sembilan.

== Demographics ==
Ethnic breakdown of Chennah's electorate as of the 2026 state election
1. Malay (47.8%)
2. Chinese (42.6%)
3. Others (7.60%)
4. Indian (2.00%)

== History ==
=== Polling districts ===
According to the gazette issued on 23 July 2026, the Chennah constituency has a total of 9 polling districts.

State constituency	Polling districts	Code	Location
Chennah（N01）	Kampong Sungai Buloh	126/01/01	SK Sungai Buloh
Chennah（N01）	Durian Tipus	126/01/02	SK Durian Tipus
Chennah（N01）	Simpang Durian	126/01/03	SMK Teriang Hilir
Chennah（N01）	Kampong Chennah	126/01/04	SK Datuk Udang Abdullah; Balai Raya Kampung Orang Asli Tohor
Chennah（N01）	Pekan Titi	126/01/05	SJK (C) Chun Yin
Chennah（N01）	Sungai Muntoh	126/01/06	SJK (C) Kg. Baru Sungai Muntoh
Chennah（N01）	Kampong Seperi	126/01/07	Balai Raya Kampung Seperi Jelebu
Chennah（N01）	Petaling	126/01/08	SJK (C) Kg. Baru Petaling
Chennah（N01）	Kampong Gagu	126/01/09	Balai Raya Kampung Gagu

=== Representation history ===
Members of the Legislative Assembly for Chennah
Assembly	No	Years	Member	Party
Constituency created from Peradong, Pertang and Klawang
9th	N01	1995-1999	Lim Yong @ Lim Chen (林岑)	BN (MCA)
10th	N01	1999-2004	Lim Yong @ Lim Chen (林岑)	BN (MCA)
11th	N01	2004-2008	Lim Yong @ Lim Chen (林岑)	BN (MCA)
12th	N01	2008-2013	Siow Chen Pin (萧進平)	BN (MCA)
13th	N01	2013-2018	Anthony Loke Siew Fook (陸兆福)	PR (DAP)
14th	N01	2018-2023	Anthony Loke Siew Fook (陸兆福)	PH (DAP)
15th	N01	2023–2026	Anthony Loke Siew Fook (陸兆福)	PH (DAP)
16th	N01	2026–present	John Siow Kong Choon (萧康骏)	BN (MCA)

== Election results ==
Negeri Sembilan state election, 2026: Chennah
Party	Candidate	Votes	%	∆%
BN	Siow Kong Choon	5,726	53.20	▲53.20
PH	Anthony Loke Siew Fook	5,038	46.80	▼14.69
Total valid votes		10,764	100.00	
Total rejected ballots		144		
Unreturned ballots		11		
Turnout		10,919	75.71	▲8.83
Registered electors		14,422		
Majority		688	6.39	▼16.59
BN gain from PH		Swing		-

Negeri Sembilan state election, 2023: Chennah
Party	Candidate	Votes	%	∆%
PH	Anthony Loke Siew Fook	5,888	61.49	▲61.49
PN	Rosmadi Arif	3,688	38.51	▲38.51
Total valid votes		9,576	100.00	
Total rejected ballots		115		
Unreturned ballots		14		
Turnout		9,705	66.68	▼16.26
Registered electors		14,554		
Majority		2,200	22.98	▲11.29
PH hold		Swing		

Negeri Sembilan state election, 2018: Chennah
Party	Candidate	Votes	%	∆%
PKR	Anthony Loke Siew Fook	5,031	50.91	▲50.91
BN	Seet Tee Gee	3,876	39.22	▼4.79
PAS	Jamalus Mansor	975	9.87	▲9.87
Total valid votes		9,882	100.00	
Total rejected ballots		166		
Unreturned ballots		3		
Turnout		10,051	82.94	▼0.81
Registered electors		12,119		
Majority		1,155	11.69	▼0.29
PKR hold		Swing		

Negeri Sembilan state election, 2013: Chennah
Party	Candidate	Votes	%	∆%
DAP	Anthony Loke Siew Fook	5,128	55.99	▲15.42
BN	Siow Foo Wen	4,030	44.01	▼15.42
Total valid votes		9,158	100.00	
Total rejected ballots		189		
Unreturned ballots		0		
Turnout		9,347	83.75	▲10.98
Registered electors		11,160		
Majority		1,098	11.98	▼6.88
DAP gain from BN		Swing		?
Source(s) "Federal Government Gazette - Notice of Contested Election, State Legislative Assembly for the State of Negeri Sembilan [P.U. (B) 193/2013]" (PDF). Attorney General's Chambers of Malaysia. 26 April 2013. "Federal Government Gazette - Results of Contested Election and Statements of the Poll after the Official Addition of Votes, State Constituencies for the State of Negeri Sembilan [P.U. (B) 234/2013]" (PDF). Attorney General's Chambers of Malaysia. 22 May 2013.

Negeri Sembilan state election, 2008: Chennah
Party	Candidate	Votes	%	∆%
BN	Siow Chen Pin	4,091	59.43	▼2.03
DAP	How Wee Shiong	2,793	40.57	▲2.03
Total valid votes		6,884	100.00	
Total rejected ballots		231		
Unreturned ballots		88		
Turnout		7,203	72.77	▲2.61
Registered electors		9,898		
Majority		1,298	18.86	▼4.06
BN hold		Swing		

Negeri Sembilan state election, 2004: Chennah
Party	Candidate	Votes	%	∆%
BN	Lim Yong @ Lim Chen	4,104	61.46	▲3.57
DAP	Ean Yong Tin Kin	2,573	38.54	▼3.57
Total valid votes		6,677	100.00	
Total rejected ballots		293		
Unreturned ballots		0		
Turnout		6,970	70.16	▼2.31
Registered electors		9,935		
Majority		1,531	22.92	▲7.14
BN hold		Swing		

Negeri Sembilan state election, 1999: Chennah
Party	Candidate	Votes	%	∆%
BN	Lim Yong	3,942	57.89	▲2.54
DAP	Siow Yoke Kim	2,868	42.11	▼2.54
Total valid votes		6,810	100.00	
Total rejected ballots		253		
Unreturned ballots		7		
Turnout		7,070	72.47	▼2.17
Registered electors		9,756		
Majority		1,074	15.78	▲5.08
BN hold		Swing		

Negeri Sembilan state election, 1995: Chennah
Party	Candidate	Votes	%
BN	Lim Yong @ Lim Chen	3,818	55.35
DAP	Siow Chee Chin	3,080	44.65
Total valid votes		6,898	100.00
Total rejected ballots		230	
Unreturned ballots		17	
Turnout		7,145	74.64
Registered electors		9,573	
Majority		738	10.70
This was a new constituency created.
