= Juasseh (state constituency) =

State constituency in Negeri Sembilan, Malaysia

Juasseh (N15)
Negeri Sembilan constituency

State constituency
- Legislature: Negeri Sembilan State Legislative Assembly
MLA
Ismail Lasim
BN
- Constituency created: 1984
- First contested: 1986
- Last contested: 2026

Demographics
- Electors (2023): 13,408
- Area (km²): 206

N15 Juasseh within Negeri Sembilan, as used for the 2023 and 2026 state elections

Juasseh is a state constituency in Negeri Sembilan, Malaysia, that has been represented in the Negeri Sembilan State Legislative Assembly.

The state constituency was first contested in 1986 and is mandated to return a single Assemblyman to the Negeri Sembilan State Legislative Assembly under the first-past-the-post voting system.

== Demographics ==
Ethnic breakdown of Juasseh's electorate as of 2026
1. Malay (80.4%)
2. Chinese (11.4%)
3. Indian (5.10%)
4. Other ethnicitiies (3.20%)

== History ==
=== Polling districts ===
According to the federal gazette issued on 23 July 2026, the Juasseh constituency is divided into 11 polling districts.

State constituency	Polling district	Code	Location
Juasseh (N15)	Kampong Tengkek	129/15/01	SK Tengkek
Juasseh (N15)	Kampong Tapak	129/15/02	SK Tapak
Juasseh (N15)	Kampong Sungai Jelutong	129/15/03	Balai Raya Kampung Sungai Jelutong
Juasseh (N15)	Kampong Padang Lebar	129/15/04	SK Padang Lebar
Juasseh (N15)	Kampong Terentang	129/15/05	Balai Raya Kampung Keru
Juasseh (N15)	Juasseh Tengah	129/15/06	SK Juasseh Tengah
Juasseh (N15)	Bukit Gelugor	129/15/07	SJK (C) Kg Baru Bkt Gelugor
Juasseh (N15)	Kampong Terusan	128/15/08	Balai Raya Kampung Terusan
Juasseh (N15)	Pekan Juaseh	128/15/09	SK Pusat Juasseh
Juasseh (N15)	Pelangai	128/15/10	SK Pelangai
Juasseh (N15)	Kampong Gentam	128/15/11	SK Tunku Munawir

=== Representation history ===
Members of the Legislative Assembly for Juasseh
Assembly	No	Years	Member	Party
Constituency created from Ulu Muar and Pilah
7th	N13	1986-1990	Mohamad Ahmad	BN (UMNO)
8th	N13	1990-1995	Mohamad Ahmad	BN (UMNO)
9th	N13	1995-1999	Hasan Malek	BN (UMNO)
10th	N13	1999-2004	Hasan Malek	BN (UMNO)
11th	N15	2004-2008	Mohammad Razi Kail	BN (UMNO)
12th	N15	2008-2013	Mohammad Razi Kail	BN (UMNO)
13th	N15	2013-2018	Mohammad Razi Kail	BN (UMNO)
14th	N15	2018–2023	Ismail Lasim	BN (UMNO)
15th	N15	2023-2026	Bibi Sharliza Mohd Khalid	BN (UMNO)
16th	N15	2026–present	Ismail Lasim	BN (UMNO)

== Election results ==
Negeri Sembilan state election, 2026
Party	Candidate	Votes	%	∆%
BN	Ismail Lasim	6,907	67.52	▲17.09
PH	Mohd Aidil Abdullah	2,816	27.53	▲27.53
BERSATU	Mohd Suhaimi Md Yusof	506	4.95	▲4.95
Total valid votes		10,229	100.00	
Total rejected ballots		82		
Unreturned ballots		9		
Turnout		10,320	75.49	▲7.46
Registered electors		13,671		
Majority		4,091	39.99	▲39.13
BN hold		Swing		

Negeri Sembilan state election, 2023
Party	Candidate	Votes	%	∆%
BN	Bibi Sharliza Mohd Khalid	4,549	50.43	▲0.02
PN	Eddin Syazlee Shith	4,471	49.57	▲49.57
Total valid votes		9,020	100.00	
Total rejected ballots		87		
Unreturned ballots		15		
Turnout		9,122	68.03	▼15.09
Registered electors		13,408		
Majority		78	0.86	▼7.55
BN hold		Swing		

Negeri Sembilan state election, 2018
Party	Candidate	Votes	%	∆%
BN	Ismail Lasim	4,146	50.41	▼10.29
PKR	Rosli Omar	3,454	42.00	▲2.70
PAS	Hassan Mohamed	624	7.59	▲7.59
Total valid votes		8,224	100.00	
Total rejected ballots		135		
Unreturned ballots		29		
Turnout		8,388	83.12	▼1.21
Registered electors		10,091		
Majority		692	8.41	▼12.99
BN hold		Swing		

Negeri Sembilan state election, 2013
Party	Candidate	Votes	%	∆%
BN	Mohammad Razi Kail	4,789	60.70	▼5.79
PKR	Rosli Omar	3,101	39.30	▲5.79
Total valid votes		7,890	100.00	
Total rejected ballots		145		
Unreturned ballots		0		
Turnout		8,035	84.33	▲8.64
Registered electors		9,528		
Majority		1,688	21.40	▼11.58
BN hold		Swing		
Source(s) "Federal Government Gazette - Notice of Contested Election, State Legislative Assembly for the State of Negeri Sembilan [P.U. (B) 193/2013]" (PDF). Attorney General's Chambers of Malaysia. 26 April 2013. "Federal Government Gazette - Results of Contested Election and Statements of the Poll after the Official Addition of Votes, State Constituencies for the State of Negeri Sembilan [P.U. (B) 234/2013]" (PDF). Attorney General's Chambers of Malaysia. 22 May 2013.

Negeri Sembilan state election, 2008
Party	Candidate	Votes	%	∆%
BN	Mohammad Razi Kail	4,169	66.49	▼7.90
PKR	Ghazali Othman	2,101	33.51	▲7.90
Total valid votes		6,270	100.00	
Total rejected ballots		160		
Unreturned ballots		0		
Turnout		6,430	75.69	▲0.87
Registered electors		8,495		
Majority		2,068	32.98	▼15.81
BN hold		Swing		

Negeri Sembilan state election, 2004
Party	Candidate	Votes	%	∆%
BN	Mohammad Razi Kail	4,672	74.39	▲16.19
PKR	Roslan Alias	1,608	25.61	▼16.19
Total valid votes		6,280	100.00	
Total rejected ballots		157		
Unreturned ballots		0		
Turnout		6,437	74.82	▲3.32
Registered electors		8,603		
Majority		3,064	48.79	▲32.39
BN hold		Swing		

Negeri Sembilan state election, 1999
Party	Candidate	Votes	%	∆%
BN	Hasan Malek	3,495	58.20	▼29.66
PKR	Shamsul Bahri Shamsudin	2,510	41.80	▲41.80
Total valid votes		6,005	100.00	
Total rejected ballots		237		
Unreturned ballots		0		
Turnout		6,242	71.50	
Registered electors		8,736		
Majority		985	16.40	▼59.32
BN hold		Swing		

Negeri Sembilan state election, 1995
Party	Candidate	Votes	%	∆%
BN	Hasan Malek	4,979	87.86	▲7.73
Semangat 46	Mat Rais Paris	688	12.14	▼7.73
Total valid votes		5,667	100.00	
Total rejected ballots				
Unreturned ballots				
Turnout				
Registered electors		8,490		
Majority		4,291	75.72	▲15.46
BN hold		Swing		

Negeri Sembilan state election, 1990
Party	Candidate	Votes	%	∆%
BN	Mohamad Ahmad	5,145	80.13	▼5.85
Semangat 46	Baharin Abdullah	1,276	19.87	▲19.87
Total valid votes		6,421	100.00	
Total rejected ballots		272		
Unreturned ballots		0		
Turnout		6,693	77.14	▲5.19
Registered electors		8,682		
Majority		3,869	60.26	▼11.70
BN hold		Swing		

Negeri Sembilan state election, 1986
Party	Candidate	Votes	%
BN	Mohamad Ahmad	4,901	85.98
PAS	Arifin Baba	799	14.02
Total valid votes		5,700	100.00
Total rejected ballots		237	
Unreturned ballots		0	
Turnout		5,937	71.95
Registered electors		8,252	
Majority		4,102	71.96
This is a new constituency created.
