= Kuala Pilah (federal constituency) =

Constituency of Negeri Sembilan, Malaysia

Kuala Pilah (P129)
Negeri Sembilan constituency

Federal constituency
- Legislature: Dewan Rakyat
- MP: Adnan Abu Hassan; BN
- Constituency created: 1958
- First contested: 1959
- Last contested: 2022

Demographics
- Population (2020): 71,004
- Electors (2026): 64,044
- Area (km²): 1,026
- Pop. density (per km²): 69.2

Kuala Pilah is a federal constituency in Kuala Pilah District, Negeri Sembilan, Malaysia, that has been represented in the Dewan Rakyat since 1959.

The federal constituency was created in the 1958 redistribution and is mandated to return a single member to the Dewan Rakyat under the first past the post voting system.

== Demographics ==
Ethnic breakdown of Kuala Pilah's electorate as of 2022
1. Malay (77.5%)
2. Chinese (15.7%)
3. Indian (5.10%)
4. Other ethnicities (1.70%)

As of 2020, Kuala Pilah has a population of 71,004 people.

Age breakdown of Kuala Pilah's electorate as of 2022
1. 18-20 (5.06%)
2. 21-29 (18.2%)
3. 30-39 (20.9%)
4. 40-49 (16.9%)
5. 50-59 (15.2%)
6. 60-69 (13.4%)
7. 70-79 (6.48%)
8. 80-89 (3.32%)
9. above 90 (0.68%)
Gender breakdown of Kuala Pilah's electorate as of 2022
1. Male (49.4%)
2. Female (50.6%)

== History ==
=== Polling districts ===
According to the federal gazette issued on 23 July 2026, the Kuala Pilah constituency is divided into 55 polling districts.

State constituency	Polling district	Code	Location
Juasseh (N15)	Kampong Tengkek	129/15/01	SK Tengkek
Juasseh (N15)	Kampong Tapak	129/15/02	SK Tapak
Juasseh (N15)	Kampong Sungai Jelutong	129/15/03	Balai Raya Kampung Sungai Jelutong
Juasseh (N15)	Kampong Padang Lebar	129/15/04	SK Padang Lebar
Juasseh (N15)	Kampong Terentang	129/15/05	Balai Raya Kampung Keru
Juasseh (N15)	Juasseh Tengah	129/15/06	SK Juasseh Tengah
Juasseh (N15)	Bukit Gelugor	129/15/07	SJK (C) Kg Baru Bkt Gelugor
Juasseh (N15)	Kampong Terusan	128/15/08	Balai Raya Kampung Terusan
Juasseh (N15)	Pekan Juaseh	128/15/09	SK Pusat Juasseh
Juasseh (N15)	Pelangai	128/15/10	SK Pelangai
Juasseh (N15)	Kampong Gentam	128/15/11	SK Tunku Munawir
Seri Menanti（N16）	Kampong Langkap	129/16/01	Balai Raya Kampung Langkap
Seri Menanti（N16）	Kampong Ulu Bendol	129/16/02	SK Ulu Bendol
Seri Menanti（N16）	Terachi	129/16/03	SK Yamtuan Hitam
Seri Menanti（N16）	Kampong Talang	129/16/04	SK Talang
Seri Menanti（N16）	Kampong Gemetir	129/16/05	SMK Dato' Abdul Samad
Seri Menanti（N16）	Kampong Ibol	129/16/06	Dewan Orang Ramai Tanjung Ipoh
Seri Menanti（N16）	Kampong Tengah	129/16/07	SK Yamtuan Lenggang
Seri Menanti（N16）	Tanjong Ipoh	129/16/08	SK Dato' Idris
Seri Menanti（N16）	Kampung Gamin	129/16/09	Balai Raya Kampung Gamin
Seri Menanti（N16）	Kampong Buyau	129/16/10	SMK Tunku Besar Burhanuddin
Seri Menanti（N16）	Sri Menanti	129/16/11	SK Tunku Laksamana Nasir
Seri Menanti（N16）	Kampung Sikai	129/16/12	Balai Raya Kampung Sikai
Seri Menanti（N16）	Gunong Pasir	129/16/13	SK Yamtuan Antah Gunung Pasir
Senaling (N17)	Temaris	129/17/01	Balai Raya Kampung Temeris
Senaling (N17)	FELDA Kepis	129/17/02	SK (FELDA) Kepis
Senaling (N17)	Rembang Panas	129/17/03	SK Rembang Panas
Senaling (N17)	Kampong Sungai Dua	129/17/04	SK Sungai Dua
Senaling (N17)	Kampong Kuala Dioh	129/17/05	Kolej Matrikulasi Negri Sembilan
Senaling (N17)	Sawah Lebar	129/17/06	Dewan Minda Kampung Sawah Lebar
Senaling (N17)	Kampong Dioh	129/17/07	SK Tunku Khurshiah
Senaling (N17)	Tebat Kering	129/17/08	SJK (T) Kuala Pilah
Senaling (N17)	Senaling	129/17/09	SK Senaling
Pilah（N18）	Ampang Tinggi	129/18/01	SK Ampang Tinggi
Pilah（N18）	Kampong Parit	129/18/02	SK Kampong Parit
Pilah（N18）	Pekan Lama	129/18/03	SK Kuala Pilah
Pilah（N18）	Taman Bunga	129/18/04	SM Sains Tuanku Jaafar
Pilah（N18）	Kampong Gemuroh	129/18/05	Balai Raya Kampung Melang
Pilah（N18）	Kampong Jawa	129/18/06	Instutut Latihan Kementerian Kesihatan Malaysia (Kejururawatan) Kuala Pilah
Pilah（N18）	Jalam Yam Tuan	129/18/07	SMJK Chung Hua
Pilah（N18）	Tengku Besar	129/18/08	SJK (C) Chung Hua Kuala Pilah
Pilah（N18）	Bukit Temensu	129/18/09	SMK Tuanku Muhamamad
Pilah（N18）	Batang Pilah	129/18/10	SJK (C) Chung Hua Senaling
Pilah（N18）	Kampong Gachong	129/18/11	SK Tanah Melintang
Pilah（N18）	Seri Pilah	129/18/12	SK Seri Pilah
Johol（N19）	Kampong Kepis	129/19/01	SK Kepis
Johol（N19）	Malan Baru	129/19/02	SJK (C) Kg Baru Kepis
Johol（N19）	Dangi	129/19/03	SJK (C) Pei Chun Dangi
Johol（N19）	Kampung Selaru	129/19/04	SK Dangi
Johol（N19）	Inas	129/19/05	SK Inas
Johol（N19）	Kampong Padang Jual	129/19/06	Balai Raya Kampung Padang Jual Johol
Johol（N19）	Pekan Johol	129/19/07	SJK (C) Yuk Chai Johol
Johol（N19）	Kuala Johol	129/19/08	SK Undang Johol
Johol（N19）	Kampung Nuri	129/19/09	SMK Datuk Undang Abdul Manap
Johol（N19）	Ayer Mawang	129/19/10	SK Nuri

=== Representation history ===
Members of Parliament for Kuala Pilah
Parliament	No	Years	Member	Party	Vote Share
Constituency created from Negri Sembilan Utara
Parliament of the Federation of Malaya
1st	P079	1959–1963	Bahaman Samsudin (بهامن شمس الدين)	Alliance (UMNO)	11,329; 66.35%
Parliament of Malaysia
1st	P079	1963–1964	Bahaman Samsudin (بهامن شمس الدين)	Alliance (UMNO)	11,329; 66.35%
2nd	P079	1964–1969	Bahaman Samsudin (بهامن شمس الدين)	Alliance (UMNO)	14,842; 73.33%
		1969–1971	Parliament was suspended		
3rd	P079	1971–1973	Abdul Samad Idris (عبدالصمد إدريس)	Alliance (UMNO)	11,762; 59.02%
3rd	P079	1973–1974	Abdul Samad Idris (عبدالصمد إدريس)	BN (UMNO)	11,762; 59.02%
4th	P092	1974–1978	Abdul Samad Idris (عبدالصمد إدريس)	BN (UMNO)	Uncontested
5th	P092	1978–1982	Mansor Othman (منصور عثمان)	BN (UMNO)	12,475; 56.18%
6th	P092	1982–1986	Napsiah Omar (نڤسيه عمر)	BN (UMNO)	19,206; 82.72%
7th	P106	1986–1990	Napsiah Omar (نڤسيه عمر)	BN (UMNO)	19,400; 81.31%
8th	P106	1990–1995	Napsiah Omar (نڤسيه عمر)	BN (UMNO)	19,444; 72.06%
9th	P116	1995–1999	Abu Zahar Ujang (أبو ظهر نيکا اوجڠ)	BN (UMNO)	24,485; 86.31%
10th	P116	1999–2004	Napsiah Omar (نڤسيه عمر)	BN (UMNO)	16,494; 54.67%
11th	P129	2004–2008	Hasan Malek (حسن مالك)	BN (UMNO)	22,105; 71.61%
12th	P129	2008–2013	Hasan Malek (حسن مالك)	BN (UMNO)	20,417; 66.23%
13th	P129	2013–2018	Hasan Malek (حسن مالك)	BN (UMNO)	24,507; 62.27%
14th	P129	2018–2020	Eddin Syazlee Shith (عيدين شاذلي بن شيث)	PH (BERSATU)	18,045; 44.85%
14th	P129	2020–2022	Eddin Syazlee Shith (عيدين شاذلي بن شيث)	PN (BERSATU)	18,045; 44.85%
15th	P129	2022–present	Adnan Abu Hassan (عدنان ابو حسن)	BN (UMNO)	21,423; 44.02%

=== State constituency ===
Parliamentary constituency	State constituency						
Parliamentary constituency	1955–59*	1959–1974	1974–1986	1986–1995	1995–2004	2004–2018	2018–present
Kuala Pilah		Johol					
Kuala Pilah				Juasseh			
Kuala Pilah		Pilah					
Kuala Pilah					Senaling		
Kuala Pilah				Seri Menanti			
Kuala Pilah		Sri Menanti					
Kuala Pilah		Ulu Muar					

=== Historical boundaries ===
State Constituency	Area					
State Constituency	1959	1974	1984	1994	2003	2018
Johol	Air Mawang; Inas; Johol; Kampung Orang Asli Charik; Kepis					
Juasseh			Beting; Juasseh; Parit Tinggi; Senaling; Tengkek	Beting; Juasseh; Kampung Majau; Parit Tinggi; Tengkek		
Pilah	Kampung Batu 46; Kampung Seri Pilah; Kuala Pilah; Senaling; Taman Nesa Jaya	Kampung Batu 46; Kampung Gunung Pasir; Kampung Seri Pilah; Kuala Pilah; Senaling	Kampung Batu 46; Kampung Parit; Kuala Pilah; Taman Melintang; Taman Nesa Jaya	Kampung Batu 46; Kampung Parit; Kuala Pilah; Taman Melintang; Taman Nesa Jaya		
Senaling				FELDA Kepis; Kampung Dioh; Rembang Panas; Senaling; Temaris		
Seri Menanti	Kampung Gunung Pasir; Kampung Sikai; Seri Menanti; Tanjung Ipoh; Terachi	Kampung Sikai; Kampung Ulu Bendul; Seri Menanti; Tanjung Ipoh; Terachi	Kampung Gunung Pasir; Kampung Sikai; Seri Menanti; Tanjung Ipoh; Terachi	Kampung Sikai; Kampung Ulu Bendul; Seri Menanti; Tanjung Ipoh; Terachi		
Ulu Muar	Beting; Kampung Kayu Ara; Kampung Pelangai; Parit Tinggi; Ulu Muar	Beting; Kampung Kayu Ara; Kampung Taman Jaya; Parit Tinggi; Jelai				

=== Current state assembly members ===
No.	State Constituency	Member	Coalition (Party)
N15	Juasseh	Ismail Lasim	BN (UMNO)
N16	Seri Menanti	Muhammad Sufian Maradzi	BN (UMNO)
N17	Senaling	Qayyum Abd Jalil	BN (UMNO)
N18	Pilah	S Leza Md Yasin	BN (UMNO)
N19	Johol	Saiful Yazan Sulaiman	BN (UMNO)

=== Local governments & postcodes ===
No.	State Constituency	Local Government	Postcode
N15	Juasseh	Kuala Pilah District Council	71500, 71550 Tanjong Ipoh; 72000, 72500 Kuala Pilah; 72100 Bahau; 72200 Batu Kikir; 73100 Johol
N16	Seri Menanti	Kuala Pilah District Council	71500, 71550 Tanjong Ipoh; 72000, 72500 Kuala Pilah; 72100 Bahau; 72200 Batu Kikir; 73100 Johol
N17	Senaling	Kuala Pilah District Council	71500, 71550 Tanjong Ipoh; 72000, 72500 Kuala Pilah; 72100 Bahau; 72200 Batu Kikir; 73100 Johol
N18	Pilah	Kuala Pilah District Council	71500, 71550 Tanjong Ipoh; 72000, 72500 Kuala Pilah; 72100 Bahau; 72200 Batu Kikir; 73100 Johol
N19	Johol	Kuala Pilah District Council	71500, 71550 Tanjong Ipoh; 72000, 72500 Kuala Pilah; 72100 Bahau; 72200 Batu Kikir; 73100 Johol

== Election results ==
Malaysian general election, 2022
Party	Candidate	Votes	%	∆%
BN	Adnan Abu Hassan	21,423	44.02	▼0.33
PH	Nor Azman Mohamad	14,940	30.70	▲30.70
PN	Eddin Syazlee Shith	11,560	23.76	▲23.76
PEJUANG	Kamarulzaman Kamdias	406	0.83	▲0.83
Heritage	Azman Idris	333	0.68	▲0.68
Total valid votes		48,662	100.00	
Total rejected ballots		489		
Unreturned ballots		220		
Turnout		49,371	76.94	▼5.70
Registered electors		63,247		
Majority		6,483	13.32	▲12.82
BN gain from PKR		Swing		?
Source(s) https://lom.agc.gov.my/ilims/upload/portal/akta/outputp/1753263/PUB615%20PARLIMEN%20NEGERI%20SEMBILAN.pdf

Malaysian general election, 2018
Party	Candidate	Votes	%	∆%
PKR	Eddin Syazlee Shith	18,045	44.85	▲7.12
BN	Hasan Malek	17,845	44.35	▼17.92
PAS	Rafiei Mustapha	4,347	10.80	▲10.80
Total valid votes		40,237	100.00	
Total rejected ballots		769		
Unreturned ballots		150		
Turnout		41,156	82.64	▼1.88
Registered electors		49,801		
Majority		200	0.50	▼24.04
PKR gain from BN		Swing		?
Source(s) "His Majesty's Government Gazette - Notice of Contested Election, Parliament for the State of Negeri Sembilan [P.U. (B) 242/2018]" (PDF). Attorney General's Chambers of Malaysia. 3 May 2018. "Federal Government Gazette - Results of Contested Election and Statements of the Poll after the Official Addition of Votes, Parliamentary Constituencies for the State of Negeri Sembilan [P.U. (B) 316/2018]" (PDF). Attorney General's Chambers of Malaysia. 28 May 2018.

Malaysian general election, 2013
Party	Candidate	Votes	%	∆%
BN	Hasan Malek	24,507	62.27	▼3.96
PKR	Mohd Nazree Mohd Yunus	14,846	37.73	▲3.96
Total valid votes		39,353	100.00	
Total rejected ballots		794		
Unreturned ballots		144		
Turnout		40,291	84.52	▲9.55
Registered electors		47,671		
Majority		9,661	24.54	▼7.92
BN hold		Swing		
Source(s) "Federal Government Gazette - Notice of Contested Election, Parliament for the State of Negeri Sembilan [P.U. (B) 179/2013]" (PDF). Attorney General's Chambers of Malaysia. 26 April 2013. Archived from the original (PDF) on 2019-12-29. "Federal Government Gazette - Results of Contested Election and Statements of the Poll after the Official Addition of Votes, Parliamentary Constituencies for the State of Negeri Sembilan [P.U. (B) 220/2013]" (PDF). Attorney General's Chambers of Malaysia. 22 May 2013.

Malaysian general election, 2008
Party	Candidate	Votes	%	∆%
BN	Hasan Malek	20,417	66.23	▼5.38
PKR	Annuar Mohd Salleh	10,409	33.77	▲5.38
Total valid votes		30,826	100.00	
Total rejected ballots		908		
Unreturned ballots		0		
Turnout		31,734	74.97	▲1.23
Registered electors		42,328		
Majority		10,008	32.46	▼10.76
BN hold		Swing		

Malaysian general election, 2004
Party	Candidate	Votes	%	∆%
BN	Hasan Malek	22,105	71.61	▲16.94
PKR	Annuar Mohd Salleh	8,763	28.39	▼16.94
Total valid votes		30,868	100.00	
Total rejected ballots		910		
Unreturned ballots		0		
Turnout		31,778	73.74	▲2.60
Registered electors		43,094		
Majority		13,342	43.22	▲33.88
BN hold		Swing		

Malaysian general election, 1999
Party	Candidate	Votes	%	∆%
BN	Napsiah Omar	16,494	54.67	▼31.64
PKR	Ruslan Kasim	13,676	45.33	▲45.33
Total valid votes		30,170	100.00	
Total rejected ballots		909		
Unreturned ballots		153		
Turnout		31,232	71.14	▲1.88
Registered electors		43,900		
Majority		2,818	9.34	▼63.28
BN hold		Swing		

Malaysian general election, 1995
Party	Candidate	Votes	%	∆%
BN	Abu Zahar Ujang	24,485	86.31	▲14.25
S46	Mohd Yusof Abd Malik	3,885	13.69	▼14.25
Total valid votes		28,370	100.00	
Total rejected ballots		1,271		
Unreturned ballots		63		
Turnout		29,704	69.29	▼3.46
Registered electors		42,869		
Majority		20,600	72.62	▲28.50
BN hold		Swing		

Malaysian general election, 1990
Party	Candidate	Votes	%	∆%
BN	Napsiah Omar	19,444	72.06	▼9.25
S46	Abd. Halim Mohd	7,538	27.94	▲27.94
Total valid votes		26,982	100.00	
Total rejected ballots		285		
Unreturned ballots		0		
Turnout		27,267	72.75	▲1.98
Registered electors		37,480		
Majority		11,906	44.12	▼18.50
BN hold		Swing		

Malaysian general election, 1986
Party	Candidate	Votes	%	∆%
BN	Napsiah Omar	19,400	81.31	▼1.41
PAS	Mansoor Keliwan	4,459	18.69	▲1.41
Total valid votes		23,859	100.00	
Total rejected ballots		1,217		
Unreturned ballots		0		
Turnout		25,076	70.77	▼3.85
Registered electors		35,433		
Majority		14,941	62.62	▼2.82
BN hold		Swing		

Malaysian general election, 1982
Party	Candidate	Votes	%	∆%
BN	Napsiah Omar	19,206	82.72	▲26.60
PAS	Othman Hamzah	4,011	17.28	▲12.67
Total valid votes		23,217	100.00	
Total rejected ballots		1,178		
Unreturned ballots		0		
Turnout		24,395	74.62	▼4.28
Registered electors		32,693		
Majority		15,195	65.44	▲41.46
BN hold		Swing		

Malaysian general election, 1978
Party	Candidate	Votes	%	∆%
BN	Mansor Othman	12,475	56.18	▲56.18
Independent	Tunku Ahmad Bab	7,151	32.20	▲32.20
DAP	Abdul Aziz Mohd Yusoff	1,556	7.01	▲7.01
PAS	Noordin Samad	1,024	4.61	▲4.61
Total valid votes		22,206	100.00	
Total rejected ballots		1,272		
Unreturned ballots		0		
Turnout		23,478	78.90	
Registered electors		29,758		
Majority		5,324	23.98	
BN hold		Swing		

Malaysian general election, 1974
Party	Candidate	Votes	%	∆%
On the nomination day, Abdul Samad Idris won uncontested.
BN	Abdul Samad Idris			
Total valid votes			100.00	
Total rejected ballots				
Unreturned ballots				
Turnout				
Registered electors		27,151		
Majority				
BN gain from Alliance Party (Malaysia) Party (Malaysia)		Swing		?

Malaysian general election, 1969
Party	Candidate	Votes	%	∆%
Alliance	Abdul Samad Idris	11,762	59.02	▼14.31
PMIP	Tunku Abdul Rahim Tunku Muda Chik	8,166	40.98	▲40.98
Total valid votes		19,928	100.00	
Total rejected ballots		1,256		
Unreturned ballots		0		
Turnout		21,184	78.12	▼4.23
Registered electors		27,118		
Majority		3,596	18.04	▼38.16
Alliance hold		Swing		

Malaysian general election, 1964
Party	Candidate	Votes	%	∆%
Alliance	Bahaman Samsudin	14,842	73.33	▲6.98
Socialist Front	Ja'alam Othman	3,468	17.13	▲17.13
UDP	Ahmad Jones	1,930	9.54	▲9.54
Total valid votes		20,240	100.00	
Total rejected ballots		1,282		
Unreturned ballots		0		
Turnout		21,522	82.35	▲6.02
Registered electors		26,135		
Majority		11,374	56.20	▲23.50
Alliance hold		Swing		

Malayan general election, 1959
Party	Candidate	Votes	%
Alliance	Bahaman Samsudin	11,329	66.35
PMIP	Ismail Chik	5,746	33.65
Total valid votes		17,075	100.00
Total rejected ballots		232	
Unreturned ballots		0	
Turnout		17,307	76.33
Registered electors		22,673	
Majority		5,583	32.70
This was a new constituency created.
