= Senaling =

Political subdivision in Malaysia

Senaling (N17)
Negeri Sembilan constituency

State constituency
- Legislature: Negeri Sembilan State Legislative Assembly
MLA
Qayyum Abd Jalil
BN
- Constituency created: 1995
- First contested: 1995
- Last contested: 2026

Demographics
- Electors (2023): 9,886

N17 Senaling within Negeri Sembilan, as used for the 2023 and 2026 state elections

Senaling is a state constituency in Negeri Sembilan, Malaysia, that has been represented in the Negeri Sembilan State Legislative Assembly.

The state constituency was first contested in 1995 and is mandated to return a single Assemblyman to the Negeri Sembilan State Legislative Assembly under the first-past-the-post voting system.

== Demographics ==
Ethnic breakdown of Senaling's electorate as of 2026
1. Malay (81.3%)
2. Chinese (14.5%)
3. Indian (3.50%)
4. Other ethnicities (0.80%)

== History ==
=== Polling districts ===
According to the federal gazette issued on 23 July 2026, the Senaling constituency is divided into 9 polling districts.

State constituency	Polling district	Code	Location
Senaling (N17)	Temaris	129/17/01	Balai Raya Kampung Temeris
Senaling (N17)	FELDA Kepis	129/17/02	SK (FELDA) Kepis
Senaling (N17)	Rembang Panas	129/17/03	SK Rembang Panas
Senaling (N17)	Kampong Sungai Dua	129/17/04	SK Sungai Dua
Senaling (N17)	Kampong Kuala Dioh	129/17/05	Kolej Matrikulasi Negri Sembilan
Senaling (N17)	Sawah Lebar	129/17/06	Dewan Minda Kampung Sawah Lebar
Senaling (N17)	Kampong Dioh	129/17/07	SK Tunku Khurshiah
Senaling (N17)	Tebat Kering	129/17/08	SJK (T) Kuala Pilah
Senaling (N17)	Senaling	129/17/09	SK Senaling

=== Representation history ===
Members of Assembly for Senaling
Assembly	No	Years	Name	Party
Constituency created from Juasseh and Johol
9th	N14	1995-1999	Zainal Mokhtar Mohd Yunus	BN (UMNO)
10th	N14	1999-2004	Ismail Lasim	BN (UMNO)
11th	N17	2004-2008	Ismail Lasim	BN (UMNO)
12th	N17	2008-2013	Ismail Lasim	BN (UMNO)
13th	N17	2013-2018	Ismail Lasim	BN (UMNO)
14th	N17	2018-2023	Adnan Abu Hassan	BN (UMNO)
15th	N17	2023–2026	Ismail Lasim	BN (UMNO)
16th	N17	2026–present	Qayyum Abd Jalil	BN (UMNO)

== Election results ==
Negeri Sembilan state election, 2026: Senaling
Party	Candidate	Votes	%	∆%
BN	Qayyum Abd Jalil	5,034	68.56	▲13.68
PH	Hanis Alimin	1,877	25.56	▲25.56
BERSATU	Mohd Izaffi Istear Khan	432	5.88	▲5.88
Total valid votes		7,343	100.00	
Total rejected ballots		99		
Unreturned ballots		8		
Turnout		7,450	75.23	▲5.92
Registered electors		9,903		
Majority		3,157	42.99	▲33.23
BN hold		Swing		

Negeri Sembilan state election, 2023: Senaling
Party	Candidate	Votes	%	∆%
BN	Ismail Lasim	3,724	54.88	▲2.02
PN	Amrina Mohammad Khalid	3,062	45.12	▲45.12
Total valid votes		6,786	100.00	
Total rejected ballots		53		
Unreturned ballots		13		
Turnout		6,852	69.31	▼13.38
Registered electors		9,886		
Majority		662	9.76	▼5.11
BN hold		Swing		

Negeri Sembilan state election, 2018: Senaling
Party	Candidate	Votes	%	∆%
BN	Adnan Abu Hassan	3,456	52.86	▼13.08
PH	Md Rais Mohamad @ Basiron	2,484	37.99	▲37.99
PAS	Fazilah Abu Samah	598	9.15	▼24.91
Total valid votes		6,538	100.00	
Total rejected ballots		107		
Unreturned ballots		33		
Turnout		6,678	82.69	▼3.32
Registered electors		8,076		
Majority		972	14.87	▼17.01
BN hold		Swing		

Negeri Sembilan state election, 2013: Senaling
Party	Candidate	Votes	%	∆%
BN	Ismail Lasim	4,450	65.94	▼3.14
PAS	Zaharudin Othman	2,299	34.06	▲3.14
Total valid votes		6,749	100.00	
Total rejected ballots		129		
Unreturned ballots		27		
Turnout		6,905	86.01	▲8.76
Registered electors		8,028		
Majority		2,151	31.88	▼6.28
BN hold		Swing		

Negeri Sembilan state election, 2008: Senaling
Party	Candidate	Votes	%	∆%
BN	Ismail Lasim	3,646	69.08	
PAS	Zaharudin Othman	1,632	30.92	
Total valid votes		5,278	100.00	
Total rejected ballots		133		
Unreturned ballots		7		
Turnout		5,418	77.25	
Registered electors		7,014		
Majority		2,014	38.16	
BN hold		Swing		

Negeri Sembilan state election, 2004: Senaling
Party	Candidate	Votes	%	∆%
BN	Ismail Lasim	3,860	74.17	▲14.24
PAS	Zaharudin Othman	1,344	25.83	▼14.24
Total valid votes		5,204	100.00	
Total rejected ballots		95		
Unreturned ballots		0		
Turnout		5,299	75.46	▲2.28
Registered electors		7,022		
Majority		2,516	48.35	▲28.47
BN hold		Swing		

Negeri Sembilan state election, 1999: Senaling
Party	Candidate	Votes	%	∆%
BN	Ismail Lasim	3,097	59.94	▼21.73
PAS	Baharudin Poan	2,070	40.06	▲40.06
Total valid votes		5,167	100.00	
Total rejected ballots		162		
Unreturned ballots		3		
Turnout		5,332	73.18	▲0.26
Registered electors		7,286		
Majority		1,027	19.88	▼43.45
BN hold		Swing		

Negeri Sembilan state election, 1995: Senaling
Party	Candidate	Votes	%
BN	Zainal Mokhtar Mohd Yunus	4,169	81.67
S46	Abu Samah Katas	936	18.33
Total valid votes		5,105	100.00
Total rejected ballots		142	
Unreturned ballots		0	
Turnout		5,247	72.93
Registered electors		7,195	
Majority		3,233	63.33
This was a new constituency created.
