= Negeri Sembilan State Legislative Assembly =

State Legislative Assembly

Negeri Sembilan State Legislative Assembly Dewan Undangan Negeri Sembilan ديوان اوندڠن نݢري سمبيلن
- 16th Negeri Sembilan State Legislative Assembly

Type
- Type: Unicameral

History
- Founded: 1959
- Preceded by: Negeri Sembilan State Council

Leadership
- Yang di-Pertuan Besar: Tuanku Muhriz ibni Almarhum Tuanku Munawir since 29 December 2008
- Speaker: Awaludin Said, BN–UMNO since 18 August 2026
- Deputy Speaker: Kamarol Ridzuan Mohd Zain, PN–PAS since 18 August 2026
- Menteri Besar: Ismail Lasim, BN–UMNO since 2 August 2026
- Leader of the Opposition: Arul Kumar Jambunathan, PH–DAP since 18 August 2026
- Secretary: Mohd Amin Ludin

Structure
- Seats: 36; Quorum: 12; Simple majority: 19; Two-thirds majority: 24
- Political groups: (As of 1 August 2026) Government (25); BN (18): UMNO (16); MCA (2); PN (7): PAS (4); WAWASAN (3); Opposition (11); PH (11): DAP (9); PKR (2); Speaker (1) BN (non-MLA)
- Committees: 4: Public Accounts Committee; Rules of Proceedings Committee; Right and Privileges Committee; Committee of Selection

Elections
- Voting system: Plurality: First-past-the-post (36 single-member constituencies)
- Last election: 1 August 2026
- Next election: By 17 October 2031

Meeting place
- Wisma Negeri, Seremban, Negeri Sembilan

Website
- www.ns.gov.my

The Negeri Sembilan State Legislative Assembly (Malay: Dewan Undangan Negeri Sembilan) is the state legislature of the Malaysian state of Negeri Sembilan. It consists of 36 members who represent single-member constituencies throughout the state. Elections are held no more than five years apart, and are usually conducted simultaneously with elections to the federal parliament and other state assemblies. It is unicameral.

The Assembly convenes at the Wisma Negeri in the state capital, Seremban.

Map of current constituencies (since 2018)

== Current composition ==
Government (25)				Opposition (11)
BN		PN		PH
18		7		11
16	2	4	3	9	2
UMNO	MCA	PAS	WAWASAN	DAP	PKR

No.	Parliamentary Constituency	No.	State Constituency	Member	Coalition (Party)	Post
–	–	–	Non-MLA	Awaludin Said	BN (UMNO)	Speaker
P126	Jelebu	N01	Chennah	Siow Kong Choon	BN (MCA)	N/A
P126	Jelebu	N02	Pertang	Jalaluddin Alias	BN (UMNO)	MP of Jelebu
P126	Jelebu	N03	Sungai Lui	Mohd Razi Mohd Ali	BN (UMNO)	N/A
P126	Jelebu	N04	Klawang	Danni Rais	PN (WAWASAN)	N/A
P127	Jempol	N05	Serting	Mohd Fairuz Mohd Isa	PN (PAS)	N/A
P127	Jempol	N06	Palong	Mustapha Nagoor	BN (UMNO)	N/A
P127	Jempol	N07	Jeram Padang	Mohd Zaidy Abdul Kadir	BN (UMNO)	N/A
P127	Jempol	N08	Bahau	Teo Kok Seong	PH (DAP)	N/A
P128	Seremban	N09	Lenggeng	Mohd Asna Amin	BN (UMNO)	N/A
P128	Seremban	N10	Nilai	Arul Kumar Jambunathan	PH (DAP)	Leader of Opposition
P128	Seremban	N11	Lobak	Chew Seh Yong	PH (DAP)	N/A
P128	Seremban	N12	Temiang	Ho Weng Wah	PH (DAP)	Political Secretary to the Minister of Transport
P128	Seremban	N13	Sikamat	Razali Abu Samah	PN (WAWASAN)	N/A
P128	Seremban	N14	Ampangan	Mohamad Rafie Abdul Malek	PN (PAS)	N/A
P129	Kuala Pilah	N15	Juasseh	Ismail Lasim	BN (UMNO)	Menteri Besar
P129	Kuala Pilah	N16	Seri Menanti	Muhammad Sufian Maradzi	BN (UMNO)	N/A
P129	Kuala Pilah	N17	Senaling	Mohamad Qayyum Abd Jalil	BN (UMNO)	N/A
P129	Kuala Pilah	N18	Pilah	S Leza Md Yasin	BN (UMNO)	N/A
P129	Kuala Pilah	N19	Johol	Saiful Yazan Sulaiman	BN (UMNO)	N/A
P130	Rasah	N20	Labu	Siti Nur Umaira Hasim	BN (UMNO)	N/A
P130	Rasah	N21	Bukit Kepayang	Nicole Tan Lee Koon	PH (DAP)	N/A
P130	Rasah	N22	Rahang	Siau Meow Kong	PH (DAP)	N/A
P130	Rasah	N23	Mambau	Lee Kai Yet	PH (DAP)	N/A
P130	Rasah	N24	Seremban Jaya	Mugunthan Subramaniam	PH (DAP)	N/A
P131	Rembau	N25	Paroi	Kamarol Ridzuan Mohd Zain	PN (PAS)	Deputy Speaker
P131	Rembau	N26	Chembong	Zaifulbahri Idris	BN (UMNO)	N/A
P131	Rembau	N27	Rantau	Mohamad Hasan	BN (UMNO)	Former Menteri Besar of Negeri Sembilan; MP for Rembau; Federal Minister
P131	Rembau	N28	Kota	Suhaimi Aini	BN (UMNO)	N/A
P132	Port Dickson	N29	Chuah	Yew Boon Lye	PH (PKR)	N/A
P132	Port Dickson	N30	Lukut	Choo Ken Hwa	PH (DAP)	N/A
P132	Port Dickson	N31	Bagan Pinang	Abdul Fatah Zakaria	PN (PAS)	N/A
P132	Port Dickson	N32	Linggi	Mohd Faizal Ramli	BN (UMNO)	N/A
P132	Port Dickson	N33	Sri Tanjung	Rajasekaran Gunasekaran	PH (PKR)	N/A
P133	Tampin	N34	Gemas	Ridzuan Ahmad	PN (WAWASAN)	N/A
P133	Tampin	N35	Gemencheh	Suhaimizan Bizar	BN (UMNO)	N/A
P133	Tampin	N36	Repah	Koh Kim Swee	BN (MCA)	N/A

== Seating arrangement ==
		N24 Seremban Jaya	N36 Repah	N18 Pilah		N17 Senaling	N04 Klawang
N23 Mambau			N07 Jeram Padang	N14 Ampangan	N27 Rantau	N19 Johol			N34 Gemas
N12 Temiang				N26 Chembong (EXCO Member)	N32 Linggi (EXCO Member)				N31 Bagan Pinang
N29 Chuah	N30 Lukut	N06 Palong (EXCO Member)	C	B		A	State Financial Officer	N13 Sikamat (EXCO Member)	N25 Paroi (Deputy Speaker)
N22 Rahang	N21 Bukit Kepayang	N01 Chennah (EXCO Member)	C			A	State Legal Advisor	N05 Serting (EXCO Member)	N28 Kota
N33 Sri Tanjung	N08 Bahau	N20 Labu (EXCO Member)	C	the Mace		A	State Secretary	N35 Gemencheh (EXCO Member)	N16 Seri Menanti
N11 Lobak	N10 Nilai (Opposition Leader)	N09 Lenggeng (EXCO Member)	C	Secretary		A	N15 Juasseh (Menteri Besar)	N03 Sungai Lui (EXCO Member)	N02 Pertang
				Speaker
		Undang	Undang	Yamtuan Besar		Undang	Tunku Besar Tampin		Sergeant-at-Arm

== Role ==
The Negeri Sembilan State Legislative Assembly's main function is to enact laws that apply in the state. The Speaker presides over proceedings in the Assembly.

The Yang di-Pertuan Besar of Negeri Sembilan, as head of state, opens each session of the State Assembly. During the first sitting of each legislative session, he is joined by the four Undangs of Negeri Sembilan and the Tunku Besar of Tampin, the very people who elected him.

The leader of the majority party of coalition in the Assembly assumes the role of Menteri Besar. He appoints members of the State Executive Council, the executive branch of the Negeri Sembilan government.

== Election pendulum ==
The 2026 Negeri Sembilan state election witnessed 25 governmental seats and 11 non-governmental seats filled the Negeri Sembilan State Legislative Assembly. The government side has 17 safe seats and 4 fairly safe seat, while the non-government side has 6 safe seats and 3 fairly safe seat.

2026 Negeri Sembilan state election

GOVERNMENT SEATS
Marginal
Repah	Koh Kim Swee	MCA	51.16
Pilah	S. Leza Md Yasin	UMNO	52.82
Chennah	John Siow Kong Choon	MCA	53.20
Kelawang	Danni Rais	WAWASAN	53.90
Fairly safe
Labu	Siti Nur Umaira Hasim	UMNO	56.56
Sikamat	Razali Abu Samah	WAWASAN	57.36
Linggi	Mohd Faizal Ramli	UMNO	58.24
Jeram Padang	Mohd Zaidy Abdul Kadir	UMNO	59.11
Safe
Ampangan	Mohamad Rafie Abdul Malek	PAS	61.45
Paroi	Kamarol Ridzuan Mohd Zain	PAS	64.98
Juasseh	Zaifulbahri Idris	UMNO	67.52
Senaling	Mohamad Qayyum Abd Jalil	UMNO	68.56
Pertang	Jalaluddin Alias	UMNO	68.08
Lenggeng	Mohd Asna Amin	UMNO	71.65
Gemencheh	Suhaimizan Bizar	UMNO	71.80
Rantau	Mohamad Hasan	UMNO	73.04
Bagan Pinang	Abdul Fatah Zakaria	PAS	74.49
Johol	Saiful Yazan Sulaiman	UMNO	74.51
Seri Menanti	Muhammad Sufian Maradzi	UMNO	75.53
Serting	Mohd Fairuz Mohd Isa	PAS	76.05
Gemas	Ridzuan Ahmad	WAWASAN	78.06
Sungai Lui	Mohd Razi Mohd Ali	UMNO	78.30
Kota	Suhaimi Aini	UMNO	78.58
Chembong	Zaifulbahri Idris	UMNO	83.48
Palong	Mustapha Nagoor	UMNO	87.94

NON-GOVERNMENT SEATS
Marginal
Nilai	Arul Kumar Jambunathan	DAP	48.78
Sri Tanjung	Rajasekaran Gunnasekaran	PKR	50.43
Fairly safe
Temiang	Ho Weng Wah	DAP	57.50
Rahang	Desmond Siau Meow Kong	DAP	59.03
Bahau	Teo Kok Seong	DAP	59.91
Safe
Seremban Jaya	Mugunthan Subramaniam	DAP	61.70
Chuah	Yew Boon Lye	PKR	61.80
Lukut	Choo Ken Hwa	DAP	63.80
Bukit Kepayang	Nicole Tan Lee Koon	DAP	73.05
Mambau	Lee Kai Yet	DAP	78.01
Lobak	Chew Seh Yong	DAP	86.66

== List of Assemblies ==
Assembly	Term began	Members	Committee	Governing parties
State Council	1955	27	Shamsuddin (1955–1959); Mohamad Shariff (1959)	Alliance (UMNO–MCA–MIC)
1st	1959	24	Mohamed Said I	Alliance (UMNO–MCA–MIC)
2nd	1964	24	Mohamed Said II	Alliance (UMNO–MCA–MIC)
3rd	1969	24	Mansor I	Alliance (UMNO–MCA–MIC) (1969–1973)
3rd	1969	24	Mansor I	BN (UMNO–MCA–MIC) (1973–1974)
4th	1974	24	Mansor II	BN (UMNO–MCA–MIC)
5th	1978	24	Rais	BN (UMNO–MCA–MIC)
6th	1982	24	Mohd Isa I	BN (UMNO–MCA–MIC)
7th	1986	28	Mohd Isa II	BN (UMNO–MCA–MIC)
8th	1990	28	Mohd Isa III	BN (UMNO–MCA–MIC)
9th	1995	32	Mohd Isa IV	BN (UMNO–MCA–MIC–GERAKAN)
10th	1999	32	Mohd Isa V	BN (UMNO–MCA–MIC–GERAKAN)
11th	2004	36	Mohamad Hasan I	BN (UMNO–MCA–MIC–GERAKAN)
12th	2008	36	Mohamad Hasan II	BN (UMNO–MCA–MIC)
13th	2013	36	Mohamad Hasan III	BN (UMNO–MIC)
14th	2018	36	Aminuddin I	PH (PKR–DAP–AMANAH)
15th	2023	36	Aminuddin II	PH (PKR–DAP–AMANAH)–BN (UMNO) (2023–2026)
15th	2023	36	Aminuddin II	PH (PKR–DAP–AMANAH) (2026)
16th	2026	36	Ismail Lasim	BN (UMNO–MCA)–PN (PAS–WAWASAN)
