= Orders, decorations, and medals of Negeri Sembilan =

Honorific order of Negeri Sembilan state

The following is the orders, decorations, and medals given by Yang di-Pertuan Besar of Negeri Sembilan. When applicable, post-nominal letters and non-hereditary titles are indicated.

== Order of precedence for the wearing of order insignias, decorations, and medals ==
Precedence:

1.	Darjah Kerabat Negeri Sembilan	D.K.(NS)	--
2.	Darjah Tertinggi Negeri Sembilan	D.T.N.S.	--
3.	Darjah Mulia Negeri Sembilan	D.M.N.S.	--
4.	Darjah Kerabat Yamtuan Radin Sunnah	D.K.Y.R.	--
5.	Darjah Seri Utama Negeri Sembilan	S.U.N.S. (previously S.P.N.S.)	Dato’ Seri Utama
6.	Darjah Seri Paduka Tuanku Ja'afar Yang Amat Terpuji	S.P.T.J.	Dato’ Seri
7.	Darjah Seri Setia Tuanku Muhriz Yang Amat Terbilang	S.S.T.M.	Dato’ Seri
8.	Darjah Seri Setia Negeri Sembilan Yang Amat Cemerlang	S.S.N.S.	Dato’ Seri
9.	Darjah Dato' Setia Negeri Sembilan	D.S.N.S.	Dato’
10.	Darjah Dato' Paduka Negeri Sembilan	D.P.N.S. (previously D.S.N.S.)	Dato’
11.	Darjah Dato' Paduka Tuanku Ja'afar	D.P.T.J.	Dato’
12.	Darjah Setia Tuanku Muhriz Yang Amat Gemilang	D.S.T.M.	Dato’
13.	Darjah Setia Bakti Negeri Sembilan	D.B.N.S.	Dato’
14.	Darjah Setia Negeri Sembilan	D.N.S.	--
15.	Darjah Tuanku Muhriz	D.T.M.	--
14.	Darjah Pekerti Terpilih	D.P.T.	--
17.	Pingat Pekerti Terpilih (1950)	P.P.T.	--
18.	Jaksa Pendamai	J.P.	--
19.	Ahli Setia Negeri Sembilan	A.N.S.	--
20.	Pingat Setiawan Tuanku Muhriz	S.T.M.	--
21.	Pingat Keberanian Cemerlang	P.K.C.	--
22.	Pingat Khidmat Cemerlang Masyarakat	P.M.C.	--
23.	Pingat Pekerti Terpilih (2010)	P.P.C.	--
24.	Pingat Jasa Kebaktian	P.J.K.	--
25.	Pingat Khidmat Lama	P.K.L.	--
26.	Pingat Bentara Tuanku Muhriz	B.T.M.	--

== Orders, decorations, and medals ==
The Most Illustrious Royal Family Order of Negeri Sembilan - Darjah Kerabat Negeri Sembilan Yang Amat Mulia

- Founded by Tuanku Jaafar on 24 May 1979.
- Awarded in a single class to Heads of State and their consorts - D.K.N.S.

The Order of Negeri Sembilan - Darjah Negeri Sembilan

- Founded by Tuanku Jaafar on 24 May 1979 as a single class award - D.N.S.
- Expanded and re-organized by Tuanku Muhriz in 2010 into two degrees
  - 1. Paramount or Tertinggi - limited to the rulers of the constituent negri - D.T.N.S.
  - 2. Illustrious or Mulia - limited to the consorts of the rulers - D.M.N.S.

The Royal Family Order of Yamtuan Radin Sunnah - Darjah Kerabat Yamtuan Radin Sunnah

- Founded by Tuanku Jaafar on 24 May 1979.
- Awarded in a single class to legitimate members of the Royal Family descended from Yamtuan Radin Sunnah - D.K.Y.R.

The Most Esteemed Order of Loyalty to Negeri Sembilan - Darjah Setia Negeri Sembilan Yang Amat Dihormati

- Founded by Tuanku Jaafar on 24 May 1979 as a general order of merit to reward and recognise loyal service to the state in all fields of endeavour.
- Re-organized with new insignia by Tuanku Muhriz in 2010. Awarded in five classes :
  - 1. Principal Grand Knight or Dato’ Sri Utama - S.U.N.S. (previously Knight Grand Commander or Dato’ Sri Paduka - S.P.N.S. )
  - 2. Knight Grand Companion or Dato’ Sri Setia - S.S.N.S.
  - 3. Knight Commander or Dato’ Paduka - D.P.N.S. (previously Knight Companion or Dato’ Setia - D.S.N.S. )
  - 4. Companion - D.N.S.
  - 5. Member or Ahli - A.N.S.

The Order of Loyalty to Tuanku Muhriz - Darjah Setia Tuanku Muhriz

- Founded by Tuanku Muhriz on 14 January 2010 to supersede the Loyal Order of Tuanku Ja’afar and to recognise and reward loyal and meritorious service to the reigning YDP.
- Awarded in four classes :
  - 1. Grand Knight of the Most Conspicuous Loyal Order of Tuanku Muhriz - Darjah Sri Setia Tuanku Muhriz Yang Amat Terbilang
    - with the personal title of Dato’ Sri - S.S.T.M.
  - 2. Knight of the Most Meritorious Loyal Order of Tuanku Muhriz - Darjah Setia Tuanku Muhriz Yang Amat Gemilang
    - with the personal title of Dato’ - D.S.T.M.
  - 3. Companion - D.T.M.
  - 4. Associate or Setiawan - S.T.M.
  - 5. and a medal : Heraldic Medal or Pingat Bentara - B.T.M.

The Order of Loyal Service to Negeri Sembilan - Darjah Setia Bakti Negeri Sembilan

- Founded by Tuanku Muhriz on 14 January 2010 to recognise and reward loyal service to the YDP and state of Negri Sembilan in the fields of politics, business or meritorious service by distinguished individuals.
- Awarded in a single class, Knight or Dato’ - D.B.N.S.

The Most Blessed Grand Order of Tuanku Jaafar - Darjah Kebesaran Sri Tuanku Jaafar Yang Amat Terpuji

- Founded by Tuanku Jaafar on 18 July 1984 to reward loyal service to the YDP and to recognise meritorious service.
- Awarded in two classes (Obsolete 14 January 2010) :
  - 1. Knight Grand Commander or Dato’ Sri Paduka - S.P.T.J.
  - 2. Knight Commander or Dato’ Paduka - D.P.T.J.

The Distinguished Conduct Order - Darjah Pekerti Terpilih

- Founded by Tuanku Muhriz as a reward of merit for federal or state civil servants who have displayed distinguished conduct within their profession or occupation.
- Awarded in a single class - D.P.T.

Conspicuous Gallantry Medal - Pingat Keberanian Cemerlang

- Instituted by Tuanku Abdul Rahman on 31 August 1950 as a reward for acts of conspicuous gallantry and heroism.
- Awarded in a single class, silver medal (P.K.C.)

Distinguished Conduct Medal - Pingat Pekerti Terpilih

- Instituted by Tuanku Abdul Rahman on 31 August 1950 to reward acts of bravery.
- Awarded in a single class, bronze medal (P.P.T.)

Medal for Outstanding Public Service - Pingat Khidmat Masyarakat Cemerlang

- Instituted by Tuanku Jaafar on 24 May 1979 to reward meritorious public service by those in public employ.
- Awarded in a single class, bronze medal (P.M.C.)

Meritorious Service Medal - Pingat Jasa Kebaktian

- Instituted by Tuanku Abdul Rahman on 31 August 1950 to reward meritorious public service by those in public employ.
- Awarded in a single class, bronze medal (P.J.K.)

Long Service Medal - Pingat Khidmat Lama

- Instituted by Tuanku Jaafar on 11 January 1968 to reward long service by state employees of not less than twenty-five years duration.
- Awarded in a single class, bronze medal (P.K.L.)

Defence Medal - Pingat Pertahanan

- Instituted by Tuanku Jaafar in 1972 as a service medal.
- Awarded in a single class, silver medal.

Installation Medal 1961 - Pingat Pertabalan 1961

- Instituted by Tuanku Munawir to commemorate his installation on 17 April 1961. Awarded in a single class, silver medal.

Installation Medal 1968 - Pingat Pertabalan 1968

- Instituted by Tuanku Jaafar to commemorate his installation on 8 April 1968.
- Awarded in a single class, silver medal.

Silver Jubilee Medal - Pingat Jubli Perak

- Instituted by Tuanku Jaafar in 1992 to commemorate his commemorate the twenty-fifth anniversary of his installation as Yang di-Pertuan.
- Awarded in a single class, silver medal (P.J.P.)

Installation Medal 2009 - Pingat Pertabalan 2009

- Instituted by Tuanku Muhriz to commemorate his installation on 26 October 2009.
- Awarded in three classes.

== See also ==
- Orders, decorations, and medals of the Malaysian states and federal territories#Negeri Sembilan
- List of post-nominal letters (Negeri Sembilan)
