= List of post-nominal letters (Negeri Sembilan) =

Order of Negeri Sembilan Royal Family

This is a list of post-nominal letters used in Negeri Sembilan. The order in which they follow an individual's name is the same as the order of precedence for the wearing of order insignias, decorations, and medals. When applicable, non-hereditary titles are indicated.

Grades		Post-nominal	Title	Wife's title	Ribbon
The Most Illustrious Royal Family Order of Negeri Sembilan - Darjah Kerabat Negeri Sembilan Yang Amat Mulia
Grand Principal	Darjah Kerabat Negeri Sembilan	D.K.N.S.	--	--	
The Order of Negeri Sembilan - Darjah Negeri Sembilan
Grand Recipient	Darjah Tertinggi Negeri Sembilan	D.T.N.S.	--	--	
Recipient	Darjah Mulia Negeri Sembilan	D.M.N.S.	--	--	
The Royal Family Order of Yamtuan Radin Sunnah - Darjah Kerabat Yamtuan Radin
Grand Recipient	Darjah Kerabat Yamtuan Radin	D.K.Y.R.	--	--	
Grand Recipient	Darjah Kerabat Yamtuan Radin	D.K.Y.R.	--	--	
The Most Esteemed Order of Loyalty to Negeri Sembilan - Darjah Setia Negeri Sembilan Yang Amat Dihormati
Grand Principal	Dato' Seri Utama Negeri Sembilan (previously Dato' Seri Paduka)	S.U.N.S. (previously S.P.N.S.)	Dato' Seri Utama	Datin Seri Utama	
Grand Commander	Dato' Seri Setia Negeri Sembilan	S.S.N.S.	Dato' Seri	Datin Seri	
Commander	Dato' Paduka Negeri Sembilan (previously Dato' Setia)	D.P.N.S. (previously D.S.N.S.)	Dato'	Datin	
Companion	Darjah Setia Negeri Sembilan	D.N.S.	--	--	
Member	Pingat Ahli Negeri Sembilan	A.N.S.	--	--	
The Order of Loyalty to Tuanku Muhriz - Darjah Setia Tuanku Muhriz
Grand Commander	Darjah Seri Setia Tuanku Muhriz Yang Amat Terbilang	S.S.T.M.	Dato' Seri	Datin Seri	
Commander	Darjah Setia Tuanku Muhriz Yang Amat Terbilang	D.S.T.M.	Dato'	Datin	
Companion	Darjah Tuanku Muhriz	D.T.M.	--	--	
Member	Pingat Setiawan Tuanku Muhriz	S.T.M.	--	--	
Herald	Pingat Bentara Tuanku Muhriz	B.T.M.	--	--	
The Order of Loyal Service to Negeri Sembilan - Darjah Setia Bakti Negeri Sembilan
Lieutenant	Dato' Bakti Negeri Sembilan	D.B.N.S.	Dato'	Datin	
The Most Blessed Grand Order of Tuanku Jaafar - Darjah Kebesaran Sri Tuanku Jaafar Yang Amat Terpuji (Obsolete 14 January 2010)
Grand Commander	Dato' Seri Paduka Tuanku Jaafar	S.P.T.J.	Dato' Seri	Datin Seri	
Commander	Dato' Paduka Tuanku Jaafar	D.P.T.J.	Dato'	Datin	
The Distinguished Conduct Order - Darjah Pekerti Terpilih
Recipient	Darjah Pekerti Terpileh	D.P.T.	--	--	
Conspicuous Gallantry Medal - Pingat Keberanian Cemerlang
Recipient	Pingat Keberanian Cemerlang	P.K.C.	--	--	
Conspicuous Conduct Medal - Pingat Pekerti Cemerlang
Recipient	Pingat Pekerti Cemerlang	P.P.C.	--	--	
Distinguished Conduct Medal - Pingat Pekerti Terpilih
Recipient	Pingat Pekerti Terpilih	P.P.T.	--	--	
Justice of the Peace - Jaksa Pendamai
Recipient	Jaksa Pendamai	J.P.	--	--	
Medal for Outstanding Public Service - Pingat Khidmat Masyarakat Cermerlang
Recipient	Pingat Khidmat Masyarakat Cermerlang	P.M.C.	--	--	
Meritorious Service Medal - Pingat Jasa Kebaktian
Recipient	Pingat Jasa Kebaktian	P.J.K.	--	--	
Long Service Medal - Pingat Khidmat Lama
Recipient	Pingat Khidmat Lama	P.K.L.	--	--	
Defence Medal - Pingat Pertahanan
Recipient	Pingat Pertahanan	--	--	--	
Installation Medal 1961 - Pingat Pertabalan 1961
Recipient	Pingat Pertabalan 1961	--	--	--	
Installation Medal 1968 - Pingat Pertabalan 1968
Recipient	Pingat Pertabalan 1968	--	--	--	
Silver Jubilee Medal - Pingat Jubli Perak
Recipient	Pingat Jubli Perak	--	--	--	
Installation Medal 2009 - Pingat Pertabalan 2009
Recipient	Pingat Pertabalan 2009	--	--	--	

== See also ==
- Orders, decorations, and medals of Negeri Sembilan
- Order of precedence in Negeri Sembilan
