= 2026 Negeri Sembilan state election =

General election for the 16th Negeri Sembilan State Legislative Assembly

- 1 August 2026

All 36 seats in the Legislative Assembly 19 seats needed for a majority
- Registered: 889,490 (▲2.92%)
- Turnout: 72.64% (▲4.29%)
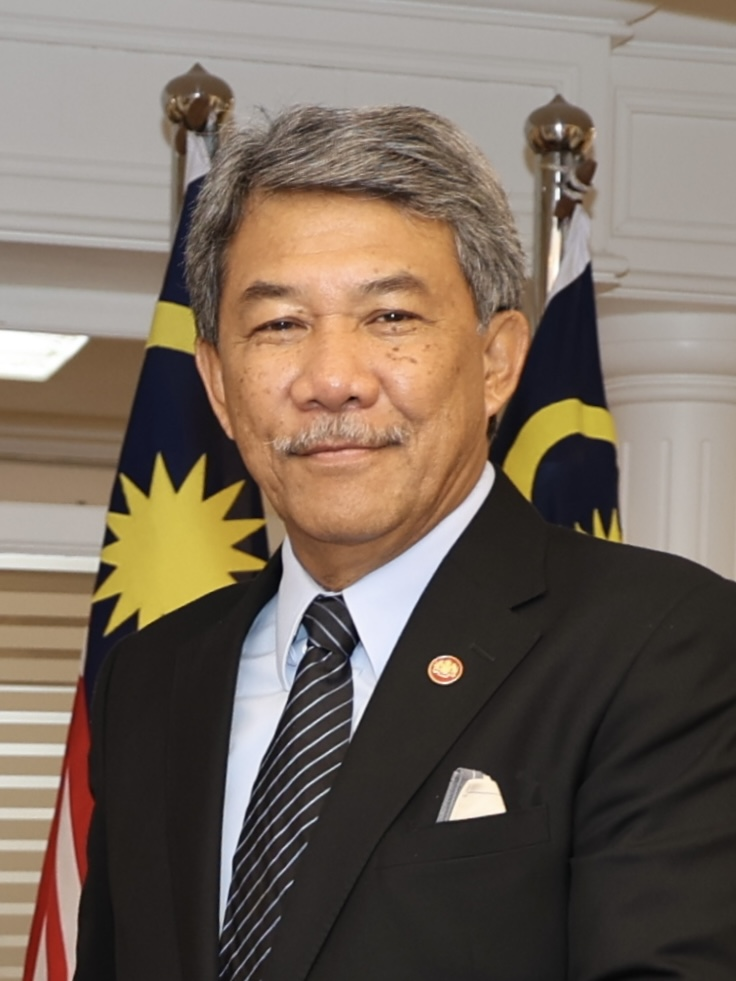

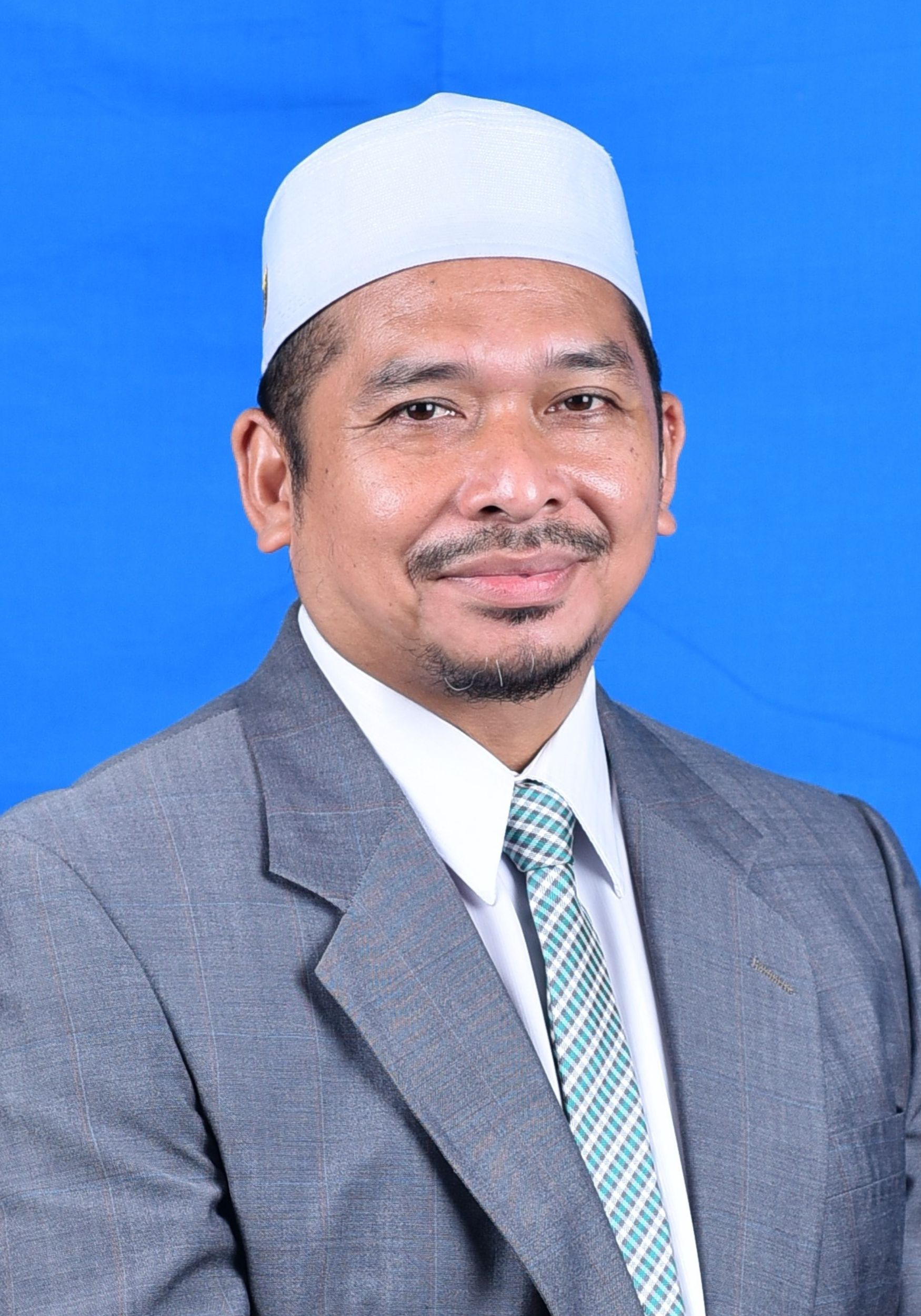

	Majority party	Minority party	Third party
			BERSATU
Leader	Mohamad Hasan; Mohd Fairuz Mohd Isa (Note: Mohd Fairuz serves as de facto leader as the post of state PN chairman is vacant.)	Aminuddin Harun	Mohamad Hanifah Abu Baker
Party	UMNO; PAS	PKR	BERSATU
Alliance	BN; PN	PH	BERSATU+ (Note: Bersatu and URIMAI)
Leader since	25 March 2004; 17 February 2024	30 August 2017	28 January 2024
Leader's seat	Rantau; Serting	Sikamat (Contested in Linggi, lost)	Labu (lost seat)
Last election	17 seats, 41.64% (Note: Combined BN and PN results but excludes BERSATU which contested under PN in 2023 but is contesting alone in 2026. The actual combined seats and vote share of PN and BN in the last election were 19 seats and 59.89% respectively)	17 seats, 38.66%	2 seats, 18.25% (Note: Contested under Perikatan Nasional in 2023.)
Seats before	17	17	2
Seats won	25	11	0
Seat change	▲8	▼6	▼2
Popular vote	357,474	256,386	16,757
Percentage	56.00%	40.16%	2.62%
Swing	▲14.36 pp	▲1.50 pp	▼15.63 pp
Menteri Besar before election
Aminuddin Harun
PH–PKR
Elected Menteri Besar
Ismail Lasim
BN–UMNO

The 2026 Negeri Sembilan state election took place on 1 August 2026 to elect members of the 16th Negeri Sembilan State Legislative Assembly.

The Legislative Assembly was dissolved by incumbent Menteri Besar Aminuddin Harun on 4 June 2026, signed by the Yang di-Pertuan Besar, Tuanku Muhriz, after a breakdown of the Pakatan Harapan-Barisan Nasional governing coalition caused by BN's disagreements with Aminuddin's response to an ongoing constitutional crisis over Tuanku Muhriz's status as the ruler of the state.

Barisan Nasional (BN) entered into an informal election pact with Perikatan Nasional (PN), defeating the governing Pakatan Harapan (PH) which had been leading the state government since the 2018 election, with the BN-PN alliance securing a landslide victory with a two-thirds majority.

PH faced huge losses with notable defeats of two of its high-ranking leaders: incumbent Menteri Besar Aminuddin left his seat of Sikamat to contest the BN-held seat of Linggi and was defeated, while Secretary-General of PH's component party, the Democratic Action Party (DAP) and federal Transport Minister Anthony Loke lost his seat of Chennah to BN's component party, the Malaysian Chinese Association (MCA) in what was described as an upset thus return of MCA party to state assembly for 13 years hiccups. Meanwhile, the Malaysian United Indigenous Party (BERSATU), which decided to contest solo following long-standing tensions with the Malaysian Islamic Party (PAS) and faced defections of its members to the recently founded National Vision Party (WAWASAN) of Hamzah Zainuddin, lost all their seats in the Legislative Assembly.

Observers attributed the result to a strong Malay vote swing and consolidation of Malay Muslim support towards the BN-PN alliance. BN and PN's call for a defense of Malay-Muslim identity and political power resonated with Malay Muslim voters, while diminishing Malay support and dissatisfaction among non-Malay voters as a result of PH's perceived anti-non-Malay policies under the federal PH-led unity government of Prime Minister Anwar Ibrahim also contributed to a swing in votes. This marked continued setbacks for PH after its recent landslide defeats in the 2025 Sabah state election and 2026 Johor state election.

A day after the election, Juasseh assemblyman Ismail Lasim was appointed and sworn in by Tuanku Muhriz as the new Menteri Besar of Negeri Sembilan.

== Constituencies ==
Electoral map of Negeri Sembilan, showing all 36 constituencies

== Composition before dissolution ==
PH			BN	PN
17			14	5
11	5	1	14	3	2
DAP	PKR	AMANAH	UMNO	PAS	BERSATU

== Background ==
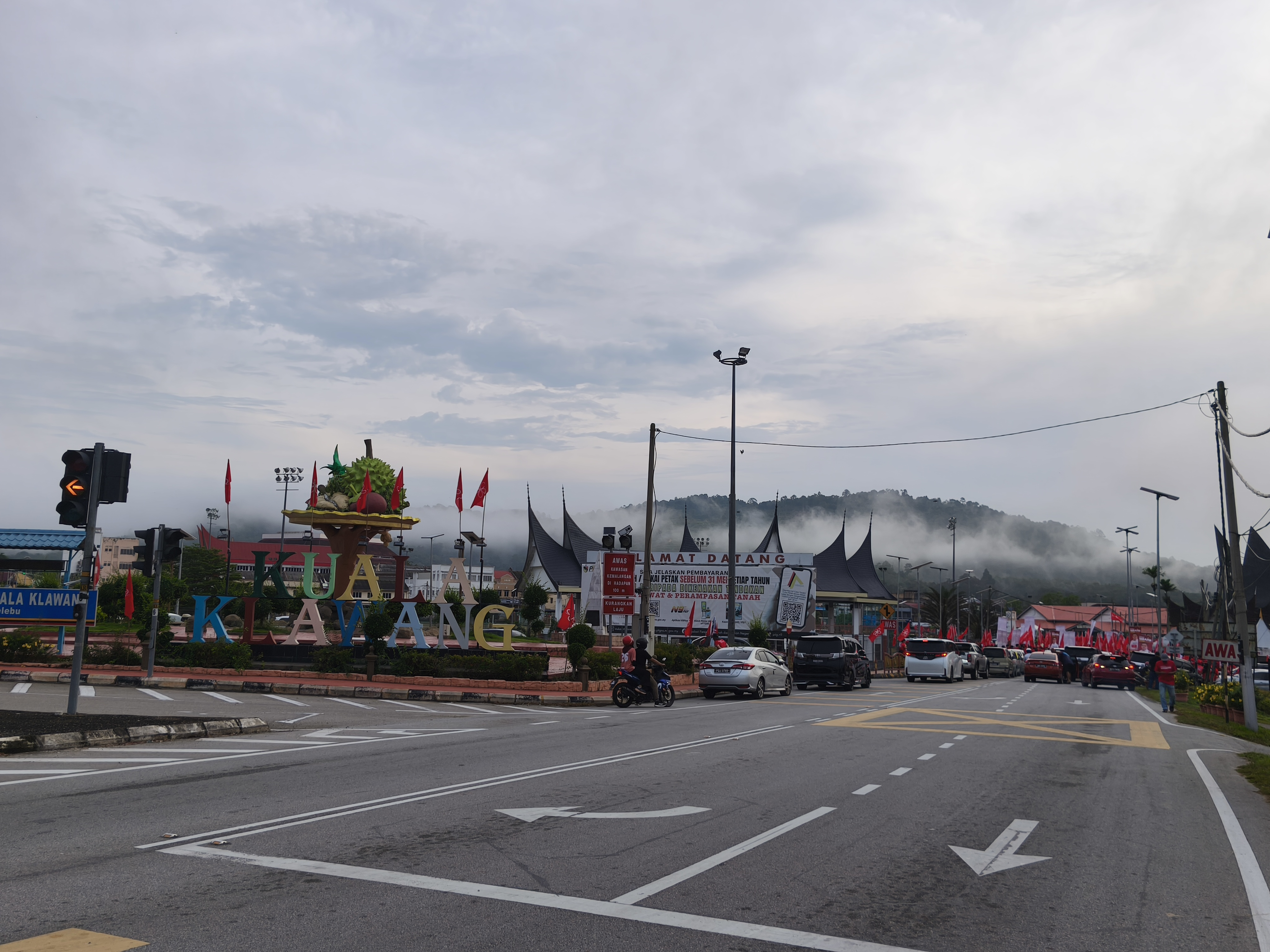
Kuala Klawang town during nomination day

=== Previous election ===
The previous state election was held on 12 August 2023 following the dissolution of the 15th State Legislative Assembly. The alliance between the Barisan Nasional and Pakatan Harapan coalitions won a two-thirds supermajority, securing 31 of 36 seats. Pakatan Harapan's Aminuddin Harun, serving since 2018, continued as chief minister for a second term at the head of a PH–BN coalition.

=== 2026 royal crisis ===
The Undang Yang Empat are the ruling chiefs or territorial chiefs who play an important role in the election of a new Yang di-Pertuan Besar of Negeri Sembilan.

On 17 April 2026, Menteri Besar Aminuddin Harun announced that Datuk Mubarak Dohak was removed from his office as Undang of Sungei Ujong, with effect from 13 May 2025, for 33 alleged offences by Mubarak relating to the state's traditional and customary laws. This announcement came after a special session of the Dewan Keadilan dan Undang (DKU) chaired by Yang di-Pertuan Besar Tuanku Muhriz advised the Luak of Sungei Ujong to accept Mubarak's removal, in which Klana Hulu of Sungei Ujong Clan Matriarch (Ibu Soko) and her immediate heirs (Anak Waris) were also in attendance.

On 19 April, Mubarak and the other three Undangs (Dato' Haji Maarof bin Mat Rashad of Jelebu, Dato' Haji Muhammed bin Abdullah of Johol, and Dato' Haji Abdul Rahim Yasin of Rembau) declared the removal of Tuanku Muhriz over claims of alleged misconduct and named Tunku Nadzaruddin, the Tunku Panglima of Negeri Sembilan and the third son of the 10th Yang di-Pertuan Besar Tuanku Ja'afar, as the 12th Yang di-Pertuan Besar.

On the 20th, Aminuddin rejected the declaration on the grounds that Mubarak, who signed and read the declaration, no longer held any authority as Undang, having not received the mandate from the Klana Hulu Matriarch and her heirs. On the following day, the four Undang claimed that Mubarak's removal was not valid as the DKU members who were present during the special session did not make a decision on the matter and that the other three Undang did not agree with Mubarak's removal, also adding that Aminuddin was no longer fit to lead the state administration and should be replaced.

The standoff led to an indefinite postponement of the State Legislative Assembly on April 23 after the Undangs boycotted the opening ceremony.

=== Royal crisis becomes political crisis: UMNO withdraws from the state government ===
On 27 April, 14 UMNO assemblymen withdrew their support for Aminuddin, accusing him of “mishandling” the royal crisis and failing to respect traditional institutions. UMNO leader Jalaluddin Alias declared that Aminuddin had failed to inform UMNO party representatives in the state executive council about prior discussions about the royal dispute and were only aware after the issue escalated. Following an emergency audience with the Tuanku Muhriz and a subsequent meeting with state DAP leaders, Aminuddin told a press conference he would remain in office for the time being. Aminuddin added that UMNO assemblymen would be removed from the Negeri Sembilan State Executive Council following their retraction of support.

The opposition, Perikatan Nasional said that it was “prepared” to work with all 14 UMNO lawmakers to form a new government and oust Aminuddin and Pakatan Harapan from the state government. Negeri Sembilan UMNO and Barisan Nasional declared that they had obtained a simple majority to form the state government with the support of the five PN assemblymen, a total of 19 seats of the 36 seat legislature, against PH's 17.

However, on 30 April, federal UMNO President and Deputy Prime Minister Datuk Seri Ahmad Zahid Hamidi announced that UMNO would remain in the unity government with Pakatan Harapan.

On 24 May, DAP secretary-general and state member for Chennah Anthony Loke said the Negeri Sembilan Legislative Assembly should be dissolved to allow voters to elect a new government as they now had a "trust issue" with UMNO and the situation was now "untenable" even though UMNO decided to remain in the state government.

=== BN-PN plot to form state government ===
A Free Malaysia Today report on 8 June revealed the existence of an alleged letter dated May 25 by Bersatu President Muhyiddin Yassin to PAS leaders, revealing that Perikatan Nasional held preliminary discussions with UMNO regarding efforts to remove Aminuddin as Menteri Besar, to form a BN-PN government. Discussions at Bersatu headquarters on April 24, involved PAS Secretary-General Takiyuddin Hassan, along with three PAS assemblymen, Bersatu Secretary-General Azmin Ali and two Bersatu assemblymen to sign a statutory declaration. Discussions that night continued to took place between state UMNO chief Jalaluddin and several of the party's assemblymen at a hotel. Ultimately, discussions between PAS and Bersatu ended on 28 April and Bersatu ended any support for a government with UMNO without agreement from PAS, following UMMO's announcement that it would remain in government with Pakatan Harapan. The action of the Bersatu assemblyman in Negeri Sembilan withdrawing support for Umno is among the issues cited by PAS President Abdul Hadi Awang as the reason for the party to reassess its relationship with Bersatu, culminating in PAS cutting ties with Bersatu on 9 June 2026.

=== Dissolution of the state assembly ===
The next Negeri Sembilan state election was not initially due until November 2028, but in a late night press conference on 4 June, Aminuddin announced that the State Legislative Assembly would be dissolved for a fresh election. The Legislative Assembly was dissolved on the next day, 5 June with the consent of Tuanku Muhriz.

Observers see PH's move for a snap election in Negeri Sembilan as a “calculated effort” to preempt any political momentum BN might gain in the 2026 Johor state election announced one week earlier on 1 June, where BN has signalled its intent to contest independently and is widely expected to secure a decisive victory. Negeri Sembilan is considered as reflective of the national political sentiment compared to Johor, which is UMNO's stronghold.

== Electoral system ==
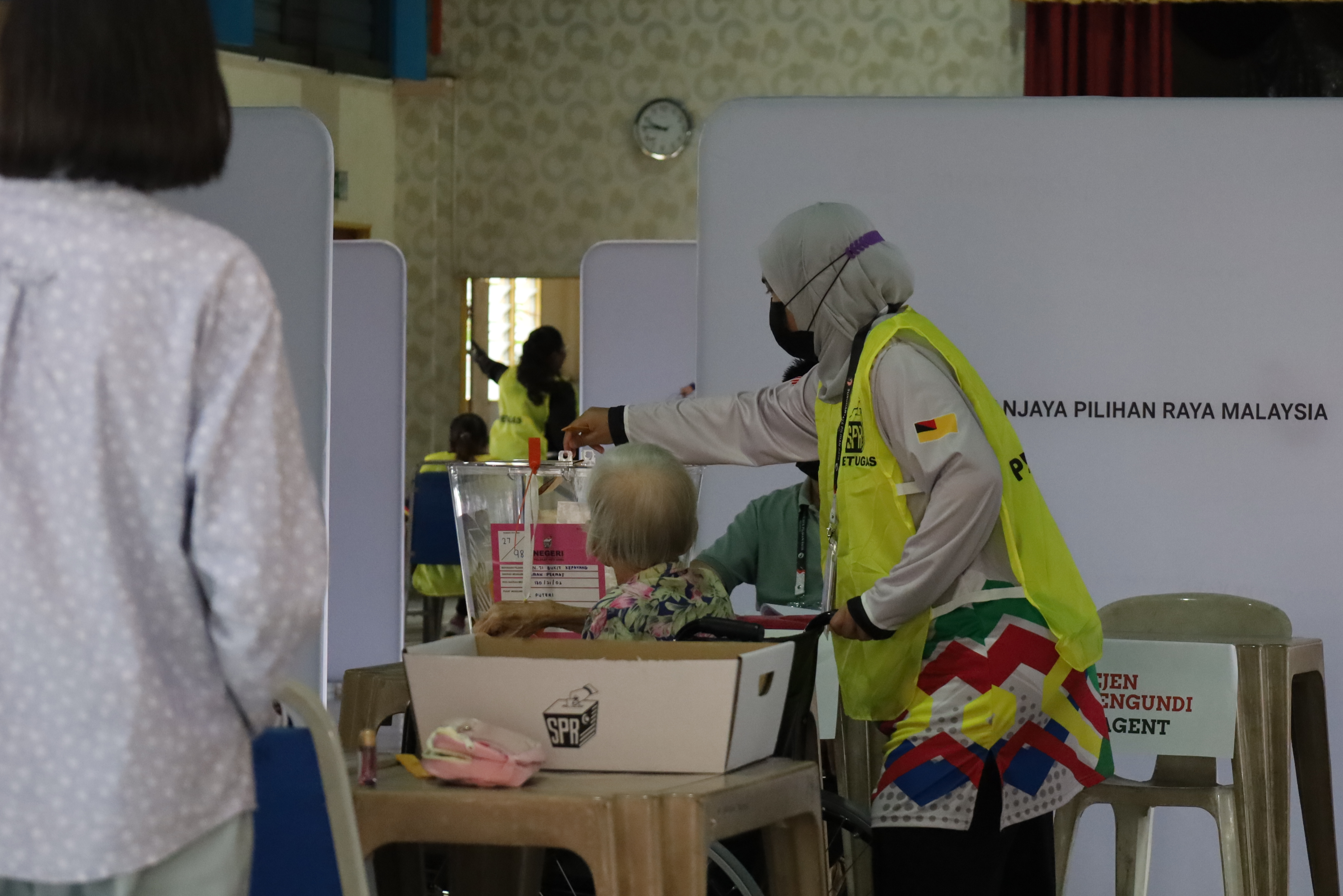
An Election Commission worker assists a senior citizen in casting her vote on polling day.

Elections in Malaysia are conducted at the federal and state levels. Federal elections elect members of the Dewan Rakyat, the lower house of Parliament, while state elections in each of the 13 states elect members of their respective state legislative assembly. As Malaysia follows the Westminster system of government, the head of government (Prime Minister at the federal level and the Menteri Besar/Chief Ministers/Premier at the state level) is the person who commands the confidence of the majority of members in the respective legislature – this is normally the leader of the party or coalition with the majority of seats in the legislature.

The Legislative Assembly currently consists of 36 members, known as Members of the Legislative Assembly (MLAs), that are elected for five-year terms. Each MLA is elected from a single-member constituencies using the first-past-the-post voting system; each constituency contains approximately an equal number of voters. If one party obtains a majority of seats, then that party is entitled to form the government, with its leader becoming the Premier. In the event of a hung parliament, where no single party obtains the majority of seats, the government may still form through a coalition or a confidence and supply agreement with other parties. In practice, coalitions and alliances in Malaysia, and by extension, in Sarawak, generally persist between elections, and member parties do not normally contest for the same seats.

The voting age is currently 18. Elections are conducted by the Election Commission of Malaysia, which is under the jurisdiction of the Prime Minister's Department. Malaysia practices automatic voter registration but does not practice compulsory voting.

== Preparations ==
=== Political parties ===
Pakatan Harapan is expected to defend its governing mandate and aim to win a majority, while Barisan Nasional also aims to win government in its own right after losing power in 2018. Both coalitions have each decided to put up candidates independently instead of an joint electoral pact, unlike in 2023. However Barisan Nasional has expressed its interest to form a new but still unnamed pact, as they only announce candidate for some of the constituencies.

Perikatan Nasional announced to contest in remaining 11 constituencies not contested by BN. Cooperation between PAS and Bersatu was put in uncertainty after PAS's decision to sever ties with Bersatu on 9 June. Bersatu initially planned to contest at least 15 seats under PN, while PAS said no decision had been made on whether the party would contest the state election using the PN logo. Bersatu announced on 15 July 2026 to contest under its own banner and may invite other parties to contest with it, despite staying in PN. Recently admitted to PN, Bersatu breakaway Hamzah Zainuddin's party Wawasan would contest under PN, while Pejuang decided not to participate. Far-right party BERJASA have also announced its possible participation and cooperation with PAS, eventually putting a candidate not contesting PN directly. URIMAI party made its electoral debut by contesting 2 seats under Bersatu.

Bersama, led by former PKR deputy president Rafizi Ramli after he left PKR and PH, was expected to contest the election as its debut and preparation for the next general election. It rejected any coalition talks. On 15 July, it was announced that Bersama would not contest the election, taking into current issues and time constraints, in order to focus on the upcoming Malacca state election. MUDA has stated it formed Progressive Block together with Socialist Party of Malaysia (PSM), open to other progressive parties. On 16 July, it was announced that MUDA would not contest in this election, in order to focus on strengthening the party for the upcoming general election, while endorsing Socialist Party of Malaysia and Parti Orang Asli Malaysia's campaign. Parti Rakyat Malaysia cancelled its initial intention to participate in the election.

=== "8123" advertisement ===
Pakatan Harapan (PH) aims to win 23 of the 36 seats in Negeri Sembilan’s state election on 1 August 2026. DAP secretary-general Anthony Loke Siew Fook describes this as a “safe” majority. He argues that while winning 19 seats would only provide a simple majority and 18 would lead to a tie, securing 23 seats would offer a stronger mandate and more political stability after the crisis faced by the previous state government. Loke made these comments at a DAP fundraising dinner in Seremban. He pointed to the “8123” motif on stage to highlight the goal of winning 23 seats. He emphasized that PH’s current 17 seats are not enough for a stable administration.

Loke did not specify which seats PH plans to target, stating that to do so would reveal their strategy. However, he mentioned that the coalition has analyzed voter demographics and believes their goal is achievable, even though analysts suggest it would require a significant shift in voter support due to BN–PN cooperation. This target was reasserted publicly and promoted in newspapers after nomination day. PH is using the “8123” message to motivate supporters for its 23-seat goal. Loke later clarified that the “8123” slogan in Chinese-language ads means “1 August, vote PH, win 23 seats.”

== Campaign slogans ==
Party	Slogan
Perikatan Nasional	Nismilan Kito Jago; Beradat Muafakat Berkat
Pakatan Harapan	Kekal Harapan; Memaknai Harapan Rakyat; Undi Harapan
Barisan Nasional	BN Terus Mantap; Stabil Maju Makmur; Kita Gerak Bersama; Hebatkan Semula Negeri Sembilan
Malaysian United Indigenous Party	Bersatu Demi Nismilan
Progressive Bloc	Lomah Dibelo, Susah Dibantu

== Timeline ==
The key dates are listed below:

Date	Event
5 June 2026	Dissolution of Negeri Sembilan State Legislative Assembly.
12 June 2026	Issue the Writ of Election.
18 July 2026	Nomination Day.
18–31 July 2026	Campaigning Period.
28–31 July 2026	Early Polling Days for Postal, Overseas and Advance Voters.
1 August 2026	Polling Day.

== Departing incumbents ==
The following members of the 15th Negeri Sembilan State Legislative Assembly did not seek re-election.

No.	State Constituency	Departing MLA	Coalition (Party)	Date confirmed	Reason	First elected
N23	Mambau	Yap Yew Weng	PH (DAP)	1 July 2026	Not seeking re-election	2008
N24	Seremban Jaya	Gunasekaren Palasamy	PH (DAP)	10 July 2026	Not seeking re-election	2013
N12	Temiang	Ng Chin Tsai	PH (DAP)	13 July 2026	Dropped by party	2008
N14	Ampangan	Tengku Zamrah Tengku Sulaiman	PH (PKR)	14 July 2026	Dropped by party	2023
N15	Juasseh	Bibi Sharliza Mohd Khalid	BN (UMNO)	15 July 2026	Dropped by party	2004

=== Incumbents who contested for a different party ===
No.	State Constituency	MLA	Coalition (Party)		First elected
No.	State Constituency	MLA	Formerly	Current	First elected
N20	Labu	Mohamad Hanifah Abu Baker	PN (BERSATU)	BERSATU	2023
N34	Gemas	Ridzuan Ahmad	PN (BERSATU)	PN (WAWASAN)	2023

=== Incumbents who contested in different constituency ===
MLA	Coalition (Party)	State Constituency		First elected
MLA	Coalition (Party)	Formerly	Current	First elected
Aminuddin Harun	PH (PKR)	N13 Sikamat	N32 Linggi	2008
Ismail Lasim	BN (UMNO)	N17 Senaling	N15 Juasseh	1999

=== Incumbents who lost re-election in the 2026 election ===
No.	State Constituency	Departing MLA	Coalition (Party)	First elected
N01	Chennah	Anthony Loke Siew Fook	PH (DAP)	2004
N04	Klawang	Bakri Sawir	PH (AMANAH)	2018
N13	Sikamat	Aminuddin Harun	PH (PKR)	2008
N18	Pilah	Noorzunita Begum Mohd Ibrahim	PH (PKR)	2023
N20	Labu	Mohamad Hanifah Abu Baker	PN (BERSATU)	2023
N36	Repah	Veerapan Superamaniam	PH (DAP)	2008

== Candidates ==
No.	Parliamentary constituency	No.	State Constituency	Number of Voters	Constituency Largest Ethnic	Incumbent Member	Incumbent Coalition (Party)	Political coalitions and respective candidates and coalitions											
No.	Parliamentary constituency	No.	State Constituency	Number of Voters	Constituency Largest Ethnic	Incumbent Member	Incumbent Coalition (Party)	Pakatan Harapan (PH)		Barisan Nasional (BN) + Perikatan Nasional (PN)		Parti Pribumi Bersatu Malaysia (BERSATU)		Progressive Bloc		Others			
No.	Parliamentary constituency	No.	State Constituency	Number of Voters	Constituency Largest Ethnic	Incumbent Member	Incumbent Coalition (Party)	Candidate name	Party	Candidate name	Party	Candidate name	Party	Candidate name	Party	Candidate name	Party	Candidate name	Party
P126	Jelebu	N01	Chennah	14,422	Malay	Anthony Loke Siew Fook	PH (DAP)	Anthony Loke Siew Fook	DAP	Siow Kong Choon	MCA	Not contested		Not Contested					
P126	Jelebu	N02	Pertang	12,873	Malay	Jalaluddin Alias	BN (UMNO)	Mohd Umry Abdul Khois	PKR	Jalaluddin Alias	UMNO	Mohd Faizal Fadli Mohd Idrus	BERSATU	Not Contested					
P126	Jelebu	N03	Sungai Lui	19,684	Malay	Mohd Razi Mohd Ali	BN (UMNO)	Zainal Fikri Abd Kadir	PKR	Mohd Razi Mohd Ali	UMNO	Mazrulhisham Abd Mansor	BERSATU	Not Contested					
P126	Jelebu	N04	Klawang	13,355	Malay	Bakri Sawir	PH (AMANAH)	Bakri Sawir	AMANAH	Danni Rais	WAWASAN	Muhammad Adib Musa	BERSATU	Not Contested					
P127	Jempol	N05	Serting	30,599	Malay	Mohd Fairuz Mohd Isa	PN (PAS)	Yaacob Mahmood	AMANAH	Mohd Fairuz Mohd Isa	PAS	Mohd Noraffendy Mohd Salleh	BERSATU	Not Contested					
P127	Jempol	N06	Palong	23,555	Malay	Mustapha Nagoor	BN (UMNO)	Muhammad Zahin Zinal Abidin	PKR	Mustapha Nagoor	UMNO	Rebin Birham	BERSATU	Not Contested					
P127	Jempol	N07	Jeram Padang	16,590	Malay	Mohd Zaidy Abdul Kadir	BN (UMNO)	Manivannan Gowindasamy	PKR	Mohd Zaidy Abdul Kadir	UMNO	Sri Sanjeevan Ramakrishnan	BERSATU	Dayana Dal	ASLI				
P127	Jempol	N08	Bahau	25,972	Chinese	Teo Kok Seong	PH (DAP)	Teo Kok Seong	DAP	Chong Fui Ming	MCA	Not contested		Not Contested					
P128	Seremban	N09	Lenggeng	28,880	Malay	Mohd Asna Amin	BN (UMNO)	Zarinna Abu Zarin	AMANAH	Mohd Asna Amin	UMNO	Zool Amali Hussin	BERSATU	Not Contested					
P128	Seremban	N10	Nilai	45,911	Malay	Arul Kumar Jambunathan	PH (DAP)	Arul Kumar Jambunathan	DAP	Lai Chien Kong	MCA	Saravana Kumar Veerasamy	BERSATU	Not Contested		Zamani Ibrahim	BERJASA	Omar Mohd Isa	IND
P128	Seremban	N11	Lobak	23,079	Chinese	Chew Seh Yong	PH (DAP)	Chew Seh Yong	DAP	Kumar S Paramasivam	PAS	Not contested		Not Contested					
P128	Seremban	N12	Temiang	12,947	Chinese	Ng Chin Tsai	PH (DAP)	Ho Weng Wah	DAP	Leaw Kok Chan	MCA	Fazly Hamid	BERSATU	Not Contested					
P128	Seremban	N13	Sikamat	34,103	Malay	Aminuddin Harun	PH (PKR)	Nor Azman Mohamad	PKR	Razali Abu Samah	WAWASAN	Tun Faisal Ismail Aziz	BERSATU	Not Contested					
P128	Seremban	N14	Ampangan	21,336	Malay	Tengku Zamrah Tengku Sulaiman	PH (PKR)	Muhammad Nazri Kassim	PKR	Mohamad Rafie Abdul Malek	PAS	Noor'azzah Harun	BERSATU	Not Contested					
P129	Kuala Pilah	N15	Juasseh	13,671	Malay	Bibi Sharliza Mohd Khalid	BN (UMNO)	Mohd Aidil Abdullah	PKR	Ismail Lasim	UMNO	Mohd Zuhaimi Md Yusof	BERSATU	Not Contested					
P129	Kuala Pilah	N16	Seri Menanti	10,105	Malay	Muhammad Sufian Maradzi	BN (UMNO)	Mohd Kamarul Arifin Mohd	PKR	Muhammad Sufian Maradzi	UMNO	Megat D Shahriman Zaharudin	BERSATU	Not Contested					
P129	Kuala Pilah	N17	Senaling	9,903	Malay	Ismail Lasim	BN (UMNO)	Hanis Alimin	AMANAH	Qayyum Abd Jalil	UMNO	Mohd Izaffi Istear Khan	BERSATU	Not Contested					
P129	Kuala Pilah	N18	Pilah	18,034	Malay	Noorzunita Begum Mohd Ibrahim	PH (PKR)	Noorzunita Begum Mohd Ibrahim	PKR	S Leza Md Yasin	UMNO	Not contested		Not Contested					
P129	Kuala Pilah	N19	Johol	12,331	Malay	Saiful Yazan Sulaiman	BN (UMNO)	Mohd Zailan Munawar	AMANAH	Saiful Yazan Sulaiman	UMNO	Not contested		Not Contested					
P130	Rasah	N20	Labu	32,884	Malay	Mohamad Hanifah Abu Baker	PN (BERSATU)	Ahmad Faez Abdul Razak	PKR	Siti Nur Umaira Hasim	UMNO	Mohamad Hanifah Abu Baker	BERSATU	Not Contested					
P130	Rasah	N21	Bukit Kepayang	49,568	Chinese	Nicole Tan Lee Koon	PH (DAP)	Nicole Tan Lee Koon	DAP	Lee Boon Shian	GERAKAN	Not contested		Not Contested					
P130	Rasah	N22	Rahang	19,715	Chinese	Desmond Siau Meow Kong	PH (DAP)	Desmond Siau Meow Kong	DAP	Yap Siok Moy	MCA	Tang Jay Son	BERSATU	Tinagaran Subramaniam	PSM				
P130	Rasah	N23	Mambau	30,346	Chinese	Yap Yew Weng	PH (DAP)	Lee Kai Yet	DAP	Erik Michael	WAWASAN	Sarawanan Nagayah	URIMAI	Not Contested					
P130	Rasah	N24	Seremban Jaya	33,015	Chinese	Gunasekaren Palasamy	PH (DAP)	Mugunthan Subramanian	DAP	Thinalan T Rajagopalu	MIC	Mahendran Ramasamy	URIMAI	Not Contested					
P131	Rembau	N25	Paroi	64,998	Malay	Kamarol Ridzuan Mohd Zain	PN (PAS)	Ahmad Shahir Ahmad Shah	AMANAH	Kamarol Ridzuan Mohd Zain	PAS	Mohd Nazree Mohd Yunus	BERSATU	Not Contested					
P131	Rembau	N26	Chembong	26,547	Malay	Zaifulbahri Idris	BN (UMNO)	Danish Nazran Murad	PKR	Zaifulbahri Idris	UMNO	Not contested		Not Contested					
P131	Rembau	N27	Rantau	34,831	Malay	Mohamad Hasan	BN (UMNO)	Azizul Hakim Mahdi	PKR	Mohamad Hasan	UMNO	Not contested		Not Contested					
P131	Rembau	N28	Kota	16,744	Malay	Suhaimi Aini	BN (UMNO)	Mohd Alif Ibrahim	AMANAH	Suhaimi Aini	UMNO	Akmal Noradzmi Abd Rahim	BERSATU	Not Contested					
P132	Port Dickson	N29	Chuah	15,129	Chinese	Yew Boon Lye	PH (PKR)	Yew Boon Lye	PKR	Pau Jeou Ching	MCA	Not contested		Not Contested					
P132	Port Dickson	N30	Lukut	28,219	Chinese	Choo Ken Hwa	PH (DAP)	Choo Ken Hwa	DAP	Sathes Kumar Nilameham	MIPP	Not contested		Not Contested		Teo Seng Lee	IND		
P132	Port Dickson	N31	Bagan Pinang	27,451	Malay	Abdul Fatah Zakaria	PN (PAS)	Nasir Raman	AMANAH	Abdul Fatah Zakaria	PAS	Sheikh Junaidy Jamaludin	BERSATU	Not Contested					
P132	Port Dickson	N32	Linggi	20,677	Malay	Mohd Faizal Ramli	BN (UMNO)	Aminuddin Harun	PKR	Mohd Faizal Ramli	UMNO	Zamri Md Said	BERSATU	Not Contested					
P132	Port Dickson	N33	Sri Tanjung	19,590	Malay	Rajasekaran Gunnasekaran	PH (PKR)	Rajasekaran Gunnasekaran	PKR	Achutan Alagan	MIC	Leevineshwaran Murugan	BERSATU	Not Contested		A. Saravanan	IND	Islah Wahyudi Zainudin	IND
P133	Tampin	N34	Gemas	29,600	Malay	Ridzuan Ahmad	PN (BERSATU)	Siti Aishah Seman @ Othman	PKR	Ridzuan Ahmad	WAWASAN	Zolazrai Zolkapli	BERSATU	Not Contested					
P133	Tampin	N35	Gemencheh	24,916	Malay	Suhaimizan Bizar	BN (UMNO)	Abd Latif A Tambi	AMANAH	Suhaimizan Bizar	UMNO	Not contested		Not Contested					
P133	Tampin	N36	Repah	27,910	Chinese	Veerapan Superamaniam	PH (DAP)	Veerapan Superamaniam	DAP	Koh Kim Swee	MCA	Not contested		Not Contested					

=== Statistics and Summary ===
103 candidates are nominated in this election.

Alliance / Party / Independents		Number of candidates
Pakatan Harapan (PH)	People's Justice Party (PKR)	16
Pakatan Harapan (PH)	Democratic Action Party (DAP)	11
Pakatan Harapan (PH)	National Trust Party (AMANAH)	9
Pakatan Harapan (PH)	Total	36
Barisan Nasional (BN)	United Malays National Organisation (UMNO)	16
Barisan Nasional (BN)	Malaysian Chinese Association (MCA)	7
Barisan Nasional (BN)	Malaysian Indian Congress (MIC)	2
Barisan Nasional (BN)	Total	25
Parti Pribumi Bersatu Malaysia (BERSATU)		24
Perikatan Nasional (PN)	Parti Islam Se-Malaysia (PAS)	5
Perikatan Nasional (PN)	National Vision Party (WAWASAN)	4
Perikatan Nasional (PN)	Malaysian Indian People's Party (MIPP)	1
Perikatan Nasional (PN)	Parti Gerakan Rakyat Malaysia (GERAKAN)	1
Perikatan Nasional (PN)	Total	11
Independent		4
Progressive Bloc	Malaysian Orang Asli Party (ASLI)	1
Progressive Bloc	Socialist Party of Malaysia (PSM)	1
Progressive Bloc	Total	2
Pan-Malaysian Islamic Front (BERJASA)		1
Total		103

==== Seats contested by candidates ====
Number of candidates	Number of seats contested
2-way contest	11 (Note: N01 Chennah, N08 Bahau, N11 Lobak, N18 Pilah, N19 Johol, N21 Bukit Kepayang, N26 Chembong, N27 Rantau, N29 Chuah, N35 Gemencheh, N36 Repah.)
3-way contest	21 (Note: N02 Pertang, N03 Sungai Lui, N04 Klawang, N05 Serting, N06 Palong, N09 Lenggeng, N12 Temiang, N13 Sikamat, N14 Ampangan, N15 Juasseh, N16 Seri Menanti, N17 Senaling, N20 Labu, N23 Mambau, N24 Seremban Jaya, N25 Paroi, N28 Kota, N30 Lukut, N31 Bagan Pinang, N32 Linggi, N34 Gemas.)
4-way contest	2 (Note: N07 Jeram Padang, N22 Rahang.)
5-way contest	2 (Note: N10 Nilai, N33 Sri Tanjung.)

==== Candidates gender ====
Gender	Number of candidates
Male	94
Female	9

==== Candidates age range ====
Age range	Number of candidates
20 – 29	3
30 – 39	12
40 – 49	39
50 – 59	33
60 and above	16

== Opinion polls ==
Pollster	Fieldwork date	Sample size	PH	BN	PN	Others	Lead	Ref
Ilham Centre	18–30 July 2026	1002						
Vodus Research	9–21 July 2026	437	42%	35%	7%	2%	PH +7%	

== Results ==
=== Summary ===
2026 Negeri Sembilan State Election
Party or alliance		Votes	%	Seats	+/–
Barisan Nasional + Perikatan Nasional	United Malays National Organisation	168,798	26.44	16	+2
Barisan Nasional + Perikatan Nasional	Malaysian Islamic Party	75,160	11.77	4	+1
Barisan Nasional + Perikatan Nasional	Malaysian Chinese Association	44,432	6.96	2	New
Barisan Nasional + Perikatan Nasional	National Vision Party	40,170	6.29	3	New
Barisan Nasional + Perikatan Nasional	Malaysian Indian Congress	13,837	2.17	0	New
Barisan Nasional + Perikatan Nasional	Parti Gerakan Rakyat Malaysia	8,889	1.39	0	0
Barisan Nasional + Perikatan Nasional	Malaysian Indian People's Party	6,188	0.97	0	New
Barisan Nasional + Perikatan Nasional	Total	357,474	56.00	25	+8
Pakatan Harapan	Democratic Action Party	132,304	20.73	9	–2
Pakatan Harapan	People's Justice Party	78,696	12.33	2	–3
Pakatan Harapan	National Trust Party	45,386	7.11	0	–1
Pakatan Harapan	Total	256,386	40.16	11	–6
Bersatu+	Malaysian United Indigenous Party	15,644	2.45	0	–2
Bersatu+	United for the Rights of Malaysians Party	1,113	0.17	0	New
Bersatu+	Total	16,757	2.62	0	-2
Progressive Bloc	Socialist Party of Malaysia	400	0.06	0	New
Progressive Bloc	Malaysian Orang Asli Party	179	0.03	0	New
Progressive Bloc	Total	579	0.09	0	0
Pan-Malaysian Islamic Front		5,844	0.92	0	New
Independents		1,337	0.21	0	0
Total		638,377	100.00	36	–
Valid votes		638,377	98.81		
Invalid/blank votes		7,707	1.19		
Total votes		646,084	100.00		
Registered voters/turnout		889,490	72.64		
Source: electiondata.MY

↓
Barisan Nasional + Perikatan Nasional government (25)				Pakatan Harapan opposition (11)
18		7		11
Barisan Nasional		Perikatan Nasional		Pakatan Harapan
16	2	4	3	9	2
UMNO	MCA	PAS	WAWASAN	DAP	PKR
Negeri Sembilan State Legislative Assembly, 1 August 2026 (36 seats)

=== By parliamentary constituency ===
No.	Constituency	Barisan Nasional + Perikatan Nasional	Pakatan Harapan	Others	Member of Parliament
P126	Jelebu	64.63%	32.59%	2.78%	Jalaluddin Alias
P127	Jempol	67.28%	27.23%	5.48%	Shamshulkahar Mohd Deli
P128	Seremban	46.33%	46.74%	5.13%	Anthony Loke Siew Fook
P129	Kuala Pilah	66.30%	30.95%	2.76%	Adnan Abu Hassan
P130	Rasah	35.01%	61.80%	3.19%	Cha Kee Chin
P131	Rembau	72.02%	25.69%	2.29%	Mohamad Hasan
P132	Port Dickson	50.52%	45.99%	3.48%	Aminuddin Harun
P133	Tampin	67.13%	31.09%	1.78%	Mohd Isam Mohd Isa

=== Lost deposits ===
Alliance / Party / Independents		Number of candidates
Parti Pribumi Bersatu Malaysia (BERSATU)		23 (Note: Seats are N02 Pertang, N03 Sungai Lui, N04 Klawang, N05 Serting, N06 Palong, N09 Lenggeng, N10 Nilai, N12 Temiang, N13 Sikamat, N14 Ampangan, N15 Juasseh, N16 Seri Menanti, N17 Senaling, N20 Labu, N22 Rahang, N23 Mambau, N24 Seremban Jaya, N25 Paroi, N28 Kota, N31 Bagan Pinang, N32 Linggi, N33 Sri Tanjung, N34 Gemas.)
Independent		4 (Note: Seats are N10 Nilai, N30 Lukut, N33 Sri Tanjung.)
Pakatan Harapan (PH)	People's Justice Party (PKR)	1 (Note: N06 Palong.)
Malaysian Orang Asli Party (ASLI)		1 (Note: N07 Jeram Padang.)
Socialist Party of Malaysia (PSM)		1 (Note: N22 Rahang.)
Total		30

=== Flipped seats ===
No.	Seat	Previous Party (2023)	Current Party (2026)
N01	Chennah	PH (DAP)	BN (MCA)
N02	Klawang	PH (AMANAH)	PN (WAWASAN)
N13	Sikamat	PH (PKR)	PN (WAWASAN)
N14	Ampangan	PH (PKR)	PN (PAS)
N18	Pilah	PH (PKR)	BN (UMNO)
N20	Labu	PN (BERSATU)	BN (UMNO)
N34	Gemas	PN (BERSATU)	PN (WAWASAN)
N36	Repah	PH (DAP)	BN (MCA)

=== Post-election pendulum ===
Pre-election pendulum

GOVERNMENT SEATS
Marginal
Ampangan	Tengku Zamrah Tengku Sulaiman	PKR	40.75
Juasseh	Bibi Sharliza Mohd Khalid	UMNO	50.43
Kota	Suhaimi Aini	UMNO	50.58
Lenggeng	Mohd Asna Amin	UMNO	50.71
Kelawang	Bakri Sawir	AMANAH	51.19
Palong	Mustafa Nagoor	UMNO	51.84
Sungai Lui	Mohd. Razi Mohd. Ali	UMNO	52.00
Seri Menanti	Muhammad Sufian Maradzi	UMNO	52.62
Jeram Padang	Mohd Zaidy Abdul Kadir	UMNO	53.39
Pilah	Noor Zunita Begum Mohd Ibrahim	PKR	54.75
Sikamat	Aminuddin Harun	PKR	54.82
Senaling	Ismail Lasim	UMNO	54.88
Linggi	Mohd Faizal Ramli	UMNO	55.14
Fairly safe
Gemencheh	Suhaimizan Bizar	UMNO	57.91
Safe
Chennah	Anthony Loke Siew Fook	DAP	61.49
Chembong	Zaifulbahri Idris	UMNO	61.92
Johol	Saiful Yazan Sulaiman	UMNO	62.29
Temiang	Ng Chin Tsai	DAP	63.50
Sri Tanjung	Rajasekaran Gunnasekaran	PKR	66.01
Nilai	Arul Kumar Jambunathan	DAP	66.29
Pertang	Jalaluddin Alias	UMNO	66.45
Repah	Veerapan Superamaniam	DAP	67.43
Rantau	Mohamad Hasan	UMNO	71.75
Rahang	Desmond Sian Meow Kong	DAP	74.17
Bahau	Teo Kok Seong	DAP	77.18
Lukut	Choo Ken Hwa	DAP	79.36
Seremban Jaya	Gunasekaren Palasamy	DAP	79.60
Bukit Kepayang	Nicole Tan Lee Koon	DAP	80.77
Chuah	Yew Boon Lye	PKR	81.35
Mambau	Yap Yew Weng	DAP	88.28
Lobak	Chew Seh Yong	DAP	94.39

NON-GOVERNMENT SEATS
Marginal
Serting	Mohd Fairuz Mohd Isa	PAS	52.13
Paroi	Kamarol Ridzuan Mohd Zain	PAS	55.33
Labu	Mohamad Hanifah Abu Baker	BERSATU	53.78
Fairly safe
Gemas	Ridzuan Ahmad	BERSATU	57.73
Bagan Pinang	Abdul Fatah Zakaria	PAS	59.30

Post-election pendulum

GOVERNMENT SEATS
Marginal
Repah	Koh Kim Swee	MCA	51.16
Pilah	S. Leza Md Yasin	UMNO	52.82
Chennah	John Siow Kong Choon	MCA	53.20
Kelawang	Danni Rais	WAWASAN	53.90
Fairly safe
Labu	Siti Nur Umaira Hasim	UMNO	56.56
Sikamat	Razali Abu Samah	WAWASAN	57.36
Linggi	Mohd Faizal Ramli	UMNO	58.24
Jeram Padang	Mohd Zaidy Abdul Kadir	UMNO	59.11
Safe
Ampangan	Mohamad Rafie Abdul Malek	PAS	61.45
Paroi	Kamarol Ridzuan Mohd Zain	PAS	64.98
Juasseh	Zaifulbahri Idris	UMNO	67.52
Senaling	Mohamad Qayyum Abd Jalil	UMNO	68.56
Pertang	Jalaluddin Alias	UMNO	68.08
Lenggeng	Mohd Asna Amin	UMNO	71.65
Gemencheh	Suhaimizan Bizar	UMNO	71.80
Rantau	Mohamad Hasan	UMNO	73.04
Bagan Pinang	Abdul Fatah Zakaria	PAS	74.49
Johol	Saiful Yazan Sulaiman	UMNO	74.51
Seri Menanti	Muhammad Sufian Maradzi	UMNO	75.53
Serting	Mohd Fairuz Mohd Isa	PAS	76.05
Gemas	Ridzuan Ahmad	WAWASAN	78.06
Sungai Lui	Mohd Razi Mohd Ali	UMNO	78.30
Kota	Suhaimi Aini	UMNO	78.58
Chembong	Zaifulbahri Idris	UMNO	83.48
Palong	Mustapha Nagoor	UMNO	87.94

NON-GOVERNMENT SEATS
Marginal
Nilai	Arul Kumar Jambunathan	DAP	48.78
Sri Tanjung	Rajasekaran Gunnasekaran	PKR	50.43
Fairly safe
Temiang	Ho Weng Wah	DAP	57.50
Rahang	Desmond Siau Meow Kong	DAP	59.03
Bahau	Teo Kok Seong	DAP	59.91
Safe
Seremban Jaya	Mugunthan Subramaniam	DAP	61.70
Chuah	Yew Boon Lye	PKR	61.80
Lukut	Choo Ken Hwa	DAP	63.80
Bukit Kepayang	Nicole Tan Lee Koon	DAP	73.05
Mambau	Lee Kai Yet	DAP	78.01
Lobak	Chew Seh Yong	DAP	86.66

== Aftermath ==
On a late night press conference on 3 August, Anthony Loke announced his resignation as the Negeri Sembilan DAP chief after 22 years, while the DAP Central Executive Committee unanimously backed Loke to continue serving as party secretary-general.
