= Kamarol Ridzuan Mohd Zain =

Malaysian politician

Yang Berhormat Tuan Kamarol Ridzuan Mohd Zain MLA
- قمر الرضوان محمد زين

Deputy Speaker of the Negeri Sembilan State Legislative Assembly
- Incumbent
- Assumed office 18 August 2026
- Monarch: Muhriz
- Menteri Besar: Ismail Lasim
- Speaker: Awaludin Said
- Preceded by: Mohd Asna Amin
- Constituency: Paroi

Member of the Negeri Sembilan State Legislative Assembly for Paroi
- Incumbent
- Assumed office 12 August 2023
- Preceded by: Mohamad Taufek Abd Ghani (PH–AMANAH)
- Majority: 5,539 (2023); 16,959 (2026)

Division Chief of the Malaysian Islamic Party of Rembau
- Incumbent
- Assumed office 2021
- President: Abdul Hadi Awang
- Deputy: Rozmal Malakan; Yahya Mohd Zain
- State Commissioner: Rafiei Mustapha; Mohd Fairuz Mohd Isa
- Preceded by: Mohamad Hassan Thamby

Personal details
- Born: Kamarol Ridzuan bin Mohd Zain Rembau, Negeri Sembilan, Malaysia
- Party: Malaysian Islamic Party (PAS)
- Other political affiliations: Pakatan Rakyat (PR) (2008–2015); Gagasan Sejahtera (GS) (2016–2020); Perikatan Nasional (PN) (since 2020)
- Occupation: Politician

Kamarol Ridzuan bin Mohd Zain is a Malaysian politician who has served as the Deputy Speaker of the Negeri Sembilan State Legislative Assembly since August 2026 and Member of the Negeri Sembilan State Legislative Assembly (MLA) for Paroi since August 2023. He is a member of Malaysian Islamic Party (PAS), a component party of Perikatan Nasional (PN) and formerly Gagasan Sejahtera (GS) as well as Pakatan Rakyat (PR) coalitions. He has served as the Division Chief of PAS of Rembau since 2021. In the 2026 Negeri Sembilan state election, he is the first Paroi MLA to be reelected since the seat's creation in 2004 and one of the three PAS candidates to be re-elected in Negeri Sembilan state elections in history alongside Mohd Fairuz Mohd Isa in Serting and Abdul Fatah Zakaria in Bagan Pinang.

== Election results ==
Negeri Sembilan State Legislative Assembly
| Year | Constituency | Candidate | Votes | Pct | Opponent(s) | Votes | Pct | Ballots cast | Majority | Turnout |
|---|---|---|---|---|---|---|---|---|---|---|
| 2013 | N26 Chembong | Kamarol Ridzuan Mohd Zain (PAS) | 3,673 | 26.57% | Zaifulbahri Idris (UMNO) | 10,153 | 73.43% | 14,062 | 6,480 | 86.70% |
| 2018 | N33 Sri Tanjung | Kamarol Ridzuan Mohd Zain (PAS) | 1,061 | 9.02% | Ravi Munusamy (PKR) | 7,366 | 62.62% | 11,952 | 4,030 | 82.87% |
| 2018 | N33 Sri Tanjung | Kamarol Ridzuan Mohd Zain (PAS) | 1,061 | 9.02% | Thinalan Rajagopalu (MIC) | 3,336 | 28.36% | 11,952 | 4,030 | 82.87% |
| 2023 | N25 Paroi | Kamarol Ridzuan Mohd Zain (PAS) | 23,840 | 55.33% | Norwani Ahmad (AMANAH) | 18,301 | 42.48% | 43,475 | 5,539 | 71.62% |
| 2023 | N25 Paroi | Kamarol Ridzuan Mohd Zain (PAS) | 23,840 | 55.33% | Syakir Fitri (IND) | 944 | 2.19% | 43,475 | 5,539 | 71.62% |
| 2026 | N25 Paroi | Kamarol Ridzuan Mohd Zain (PAS) | 32,004 | 64.98% | Ahmad Shahir Mohd Shah (AMANAH) | 15,045 | 30.55% | 49,785 | 16,959 | 76.6% |
| 2026 | N25 Paroi | Kamarol Ridzuan Mohd Zain (PAS) | 32,004 | 64.98% | Mohd Nazree bin Mohd Yunus (BERSATU) | 2,205 | 4.48% | 49,785 | 16,959 | 76.6% |
