= Ikatan Prihatin Rakyat =

Political coalition in Malaysia

People's Care Alliance Ikatan Prihatin Rakyat
- Malay name: Ikatan Prihatin Rakyat
- Tamil name: மக்கள் நல கூட்டணி (Makkal Nala Kootani)
- Jawi name: ايكتن ڤريهاتين رعيت
- Abbreviation: IPR
- Leader: Muhyiddin Yassin
- Founded: 2025
- Split from: Perikatan Nasional (PN)
- Headquarters: Kuala Lumpur, Malaysia
- Membership (2025): Malaysian United Indigenous Party (BERSATU); Parti Bumiputera Perkasa Malaysia (PUTRA); Malaysian Advancement Party (MAP); United for the Rights of Malaysians Party (URIMAI)
- Ideology: Big tent Populism
- Political position: Centre-right to right-wing
- Colors: Red
- Slogan: "Selamatkan Malaysia" ("Save Malaysia")

Election symbol

Party flag

The Ikatan Prihatin Rakyat (IPR or People's Care Alliance) is an informal Malaysian political coalition. It was formed by Malaysian United Indigenous Party (BERSATU) president Muhyiddin Yassin with the intention of uniting opposition political parties.

== History ==
A meeting was held on 18 July 2025 to discuss the formation of a loose alliance of non-government parties, led by Perikatan Nasional and Malaysian United Indigenous Party (BERSATU) chairman Muhyiddin Yassin. Notably, the meeting was not attended by the Malaysian Islamic Party (PAS).

Muhyiddin announced the alliance's formation on 18 August 2025, naming 12 parties as participants, including PAS and the Socialist Party of Malaysia (PSM).

The coalition's name was announced on 14 October 2025, with PSM absent from a list of participating parties.

After BERSATU decided to contest separately from Perikatan Nasional in 2026 Negeri Sembilan state election, Muhyiddin proposed that a new alliance would be made between the party and URIMAI and PUTRA for next elections, all three being in the IPR.

== Component parties ==
- Malaysian United Indigenous Party (BERSATU)
- Parti Bumiputera Perkasa Malaysia (PUTRA)
- Malaysian Advancement Party (MAP)
- United for the Rights of Malaysians Party (URIMAI)

== List of leaders ==
=== Chairman ===
| No. | Name (Birth–Death) | Term of office | Time in office | Political party |
|---|---|---|---|---|
| 1 | Muhyiddin Yassin | 14 October 2025 | 320 days | BERSATU |

== Elected representatives ==
- Members of the Dewan Rakyat, 15th Malaysian Parliament
- Malaysian State Assembly Representatives (2023-present)

== Election results ==
This list only includes results where IPR parties contested separately from Perikatan Nasional or Blok Progresif

=== State election results ===
| State election | State Legislative Assembly | | | | | | | | | | | | | |
| State election | Perlis | Kedah | Kelantan | Terengganu | Penang | Perak | Pahang | Selangor | Negeri Sembilan | Malacca | Johor | Sabah | Sarawak | Total won / Total contested |
|---|---|---|---|---|---|---|---|---|---|---|---|---|---|---|
| 2/3 majority | 2 / 3 | 2 / 3 | 2 / 3 | 2 / 3 | 2 / 3 | 2 / 3 | 2 / 3 | 2 / 3 | 2 / 3 | 2 / 3 | 2 / 3 | 2 / 3 | 2 / 3 | |
| 2026 | | | | | | | | | 0 / 36 | | | | | 0 / 24 |
