= United for the Rights of Malaysians Party =

- Malay name: Parti Bersepakat Untuk Hak Rakyat Malaysia ڤرتي برسڤاكت حق رعيت مليسيا
- Chinese name: 马来西亚民权共识党; Mǎláixīyà mínquán gòngshì dǎng
- Tamil name: மலேசியர் ஐக்கிய உரிமை கட்சி Malēciyar aikkiya urimai kaṭci
- Abbreviation: URIMAI
- Chairperson: Ramasamy Palanisamy (interim)
- Founded: 26 November 2023; 2 years ago
- Split from: Democratic Action Party
- Ideology: Malaysian Indians' interests Minority rights Multiculturalism
- National affiliation: Ikatan Prihatin Rakyat (since 2025)
- Colours: Red; White
- Slogan: Political Force Of The Voiceless
- Dewan Negara: 0 / 70
- Dewan Rakyat: 0 / 222

Website
- www.urimaiparty.my

The United for the Rights of Malaysians Party (abbrev: URIMAI; Malay: Parti Bersepakat Hak Rakyat Malaysia) is a Malaysian political party. It was founded by former Deputy Chief Minister of Penang Ramasamy Palanisamy after he left the Democratic Action Party (DAP). The party has yet to be registered by the country's Registrar of Societies. Pending legalisation, interim party chairman Ramsamy has referred to the party as "movement to defend the rights of the people, especially the non-Malays." Despite being Indian-focused, Ramasamy has asserted that it would be open to all ethnic groups, but has said he would not refer to it as "multi-racial like other political parties."

The party's founding, according to Ramasamy, is motivated by the country's neglect of its Indian population. He also asserted that the Democratic Action Party and its partner the People's Justice Party (PKR), both of which are part of the unity government, failed to represent the interests of the Indian population while in power despite claiming to be multi-racial.

== History ==
The party helped campaign for the Socialist Party of Malaysia during the 2025 Ayer Kuning by-election. After Bersatu decided to contest independently in 2026 Negeri Sembilan election, URIMAI for the first time ran in election through two candidates running under Bersatu banner. Bersatu anticipated a new coalition with Urimai and Parti Bumiputera Perkasa Malaysia (Putra) being its first partners.

== Election results ==
=== State elections ===
State assembly	Election	Votes	%	Seats	Won/contested	+/–	Position (Note: As part of electoral coalition.)	Status
Perlis	2022	Did not contest						No seats
Kedah	2023	Did not contest						No seats
Kelantan	2023	Did not contest						No seats
Terengganu	2023	Did not contest						No seats
Penang	2023	Did not contest						No seats
Perak	2022	Did not contest						No seats
Pahang	2022	Did not contest						No seats
Selangor	2023	Did not contest						No seats
Negeri Sembilan	2026	1,113	0.2	0 / 36	0 / 2	Steady	4th (BERSATU Plus)	No seats
Malacca	2026	Did not contest						No seats
Johor	2026	Did not contest						No seats
Sabah	2025	Did not contest						No seats
Sarawak	2021	Did not contest						No seats

Note

State election	State Legislative Assembly				
State election	Penang	Selangor	Negeri Sembilan	Johor	Total won / Total contested
2/3 majority	2 / 3	2 / 3	2 / 3	2 / 3	
2026			0 / 36		0 / 2
