= Malaysian Orang Asli Party =

Political party of Malaysia

Malaysian Orang Asli Party Parti Orang Asli Malaysia
- Abbreviation: ASLI
- Leader: Rashid Ka'
- President: Rashid Ka'
- Founder: Rashid Ka'
- Founded: December 6, 2022
- Legalised: December 6, 2022
- Membership (2024): 11,000
- Ideology: Indigenous rights; Orang Asli advocacy; Indigenous land rights
- Political position: Centre-left
- National affiliation: Progressive Bloc
- Colours: Bright orange Black
- Dewan Negara: 0 / 70
- Dewan Rakyat: 0 / 222
- Dewan Undangan Negeri: 0 / 611

Website
- ASLI on Facebook

The Malaysian Orang Asli Party (Malay: Parti Orang Asli Malaysia, abbreviated ASLI) is an indigenous rights party representing Orang Asli aborigine tribes in Malaysia. The party was registered in December 2022 and led by its founder Rashid Ka'

== History ==
ASLI was founded on 2023 by 500 members of aboriginal leaders representing all 19 Orang Asli tribes in Malaysia. Its intention was to unite Orang Asli political representation previously split among major Malaysian parties and non-governmental organisations. The party however denied opposing the ruling Unity Government.

The party welcomes but have criticized government intention to revise Orang Asli act. It claimed lack of proper Orang Asli representation on participatory deliberation within existing government structures such as Orang Asli Development Department (JAKOA) and demanded that Orang Asli Native Land should be recognised in the act.

It planned to contest the 2024 Kuala Kubu Baharu by-election against all parties before retracting their intention, citing technical problems. By 2024 the party claimed to have 11,000 members and have organised multiple state branches nationwide, and targets contesting 11 parliamentary seats in next Malaysian general election.

The party made its first electoral appearance at 2026 Johor state election, and decided to campaign with Blok Progresif initiated by PSM and MUDA for Negeri Sembilan election the same year.

== Election results ==
=== State election results ===
State assembly	Election	Votes	%	Seats	Won/contested	+/–	Position (Note: As part of electoral coalition.)	Status
Perlis	2022	Did not contest						No seats
Kedah	2023	Did not contest						No seats
Kelantan	2023	Did not contest						No seats
Terengganu	2023	Did not contest						No seats
Penang	2023	Did not contest						No seats
Perak	2022	Did not contest						No seats
Pahang	2022	Did not contest						No seats
Selangor	2023	Did not contest						No seats
Negeri Sembilan	2026	179	0.0	0 / 36	0 / 1	Steady	6th (Blok Progresif)	No seats
Malacca	2026	Did not contest						No seats
Johor	2026	394	0.0	0 / 56	0 / 1	Steady	5th (Blok Progresif)	No seats
Sabah	2025	Did not contest						No seats
Sarawak	2021	Did not contest						No seats

Note

State election	State Legislative Assembly													
State election	Perlis	Kedah	Kelantan	Terengganu	Penang	Perak	Pahang	Selangor	Negeri Sembilan	Malacca	Johor	Sabah	Sarawak	Total won / Total contested
2/3 majority	2 / 3	2 / 3	2 / 3	2 / 3	2 / 3	2 / 3	2 / 3	2 / 3	2 / 3	2 / 3	2 / 3	2 / 3	2 / 3	
2026									0 / 36		0 / 56			0 / 2

== See also ==
- Politics of Malaysia
- List of political parties in Malaysia
