= Malaysian Indian People's Party =

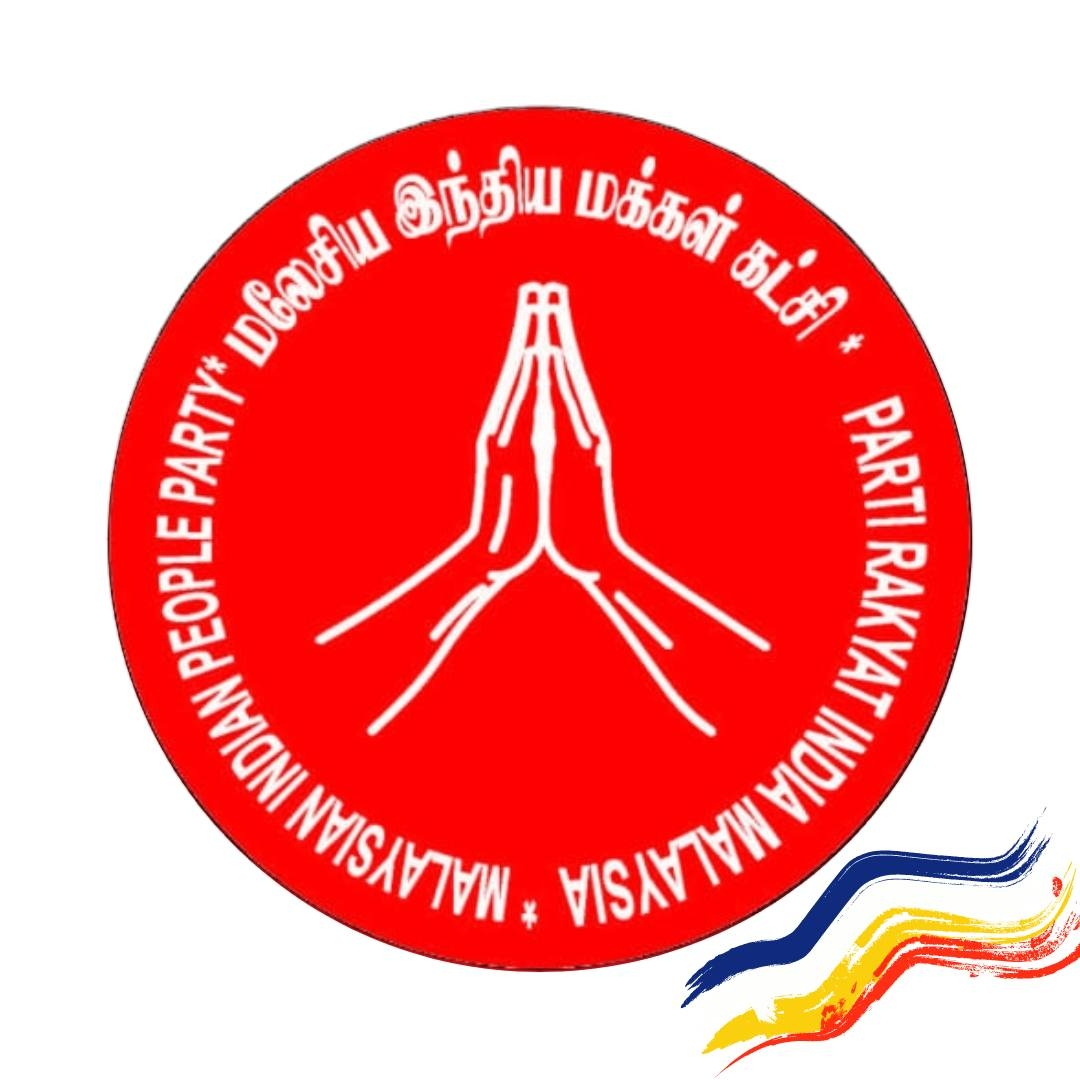
- Malay name: Parti Rakyat India Malaysia
- Chinese name: 马来西亚印度人民党
- Tamil name: மலேசியா இந்திய மக்கள் கட்சி
- Abbreviation: MIPP
- President: Punithan Paramsiven
- Presidium: S Subramaniam
- Spokesperson: Justin Prabakaran
- Founded: 28 May 2018
- Registered: 28 May 2019
- Split from: Malaysian Indian Congress (P. Paramsiven)
- Headquarters: Kuala Lumpur
- Membership (2026): 200,000 (claimed), 38 (official)
- Ideology: Malaysian Indians' interests Multiculturalism; Nationalism; Popular democracy
- Political position: Right-wing
- National affiliation: Perikatan Nasional (since 2024)
- Regional affiliation: Malaysian Indian
- Colours: Red; White
- Slogan: "SOCIAL SERVICE, SOCIAL CONCERN" (BERKHIDMAT UNTUK MASYARAKAT, BERFOKUS UNTUK MASYARAKAT KITA, சமுதாய சேவை சமுதாய சிந்தனை)
- Dewan Negara: 0 / 70
- Dewan Rakyat: 0 / 222

Election symbol

Website
- https://www.facebook.com/profile.php?id=61554725033540

The Malaysian Indian People Party (Malay: Parti Rakyat India Malaysia), abbreviated MIPP, is a nationalist ethnic Indian political party in Malaysia.

MIPP was approved and registered on 28 May 2019 by the Registrar of Societies (ROS). Former Selangor MIC Youth chief Punithan Paramsiven took over the party to join Perikatan Nasional coalition since 2024. The party main ideology is to look after the interest of Malaysian Indians. The party draws its strength from 160 branch formation across Malaysia, targeting ethnic Malaysian Indians.

== List of leaders ==
=== President ===
Order	Name	Term of office		Remarks
1	Santharasekaran Subramaniam	2019	2023	
2	Punithan Paramsiven	2023	Incumbent	

== Leadership Disputes and Legal Issues (2025–2026) ==
In late 2025, internal disputes emerged within the Malaysian Indian People's Party (MIPP) regarding its leadership and governance. In October 2025, a complaint was lodged with the Registrar of Societies (RoS) questioning the validity of the party's annual general meetings and office-bearers. According to party founder S. Santharasekaran, the RoS issued an initial findings letter on 5 December 2025, confirming several constitutional violations under the current leadership, including the failure to use the official party bank account for fundraising, the involvement of non-members in party activities, and the unlawful waiver of membership fees. However, subsequent RoS communications in January 2026 omitted these findings and cleared the party's leadership, validating P. Punithan's presidency.

Amidst these controversies, the RoS revealed in March 2026 that MIPP was among the political entities that had faced temporary deregistration due to internal member disputes or a failure to submit annual returns, before being allowed to operate again upon appeal.

== Election results ==
State assembly	Election	Votes	%	Seats	Won/contested	+/–	Position (Note: As part of electoral coalition.)	Status
Perlis	2022	Did not contest						No seats
Kedah	2023	Did not contest						No seats
Kelantan	2023	Did not contest						No seats
Terengganu	2023	Did not contest						No seats
Penang	2023	Did not contest						No seats
Perak	2022	Did not contest						No seats
Pahang	2022	Did not contest						No seats
Selangor	2023	Did not contest						No seats
Negeri Sembilan	2026	6,188	1.0	0 / 36	0 / 1	Steady	3rd (Perikatan Nasional)	No seats
Malacca	2026	Did not contest						No seats
Johor	2026	8,196	0.4	0 / 56	0 / 5	Steady	3rd (Perikatan Nasional)	No seats
Sabah	2025	Did not contest						No seats
Sarawak	2021	Did not contest						No seats

Note

State election	State Legislative Assembly				
State election	Penang	Selangor	Negeri Sembilan	Johor	Total won / Total contested
2/3 majority	2 / 3	2 / 3	2 / 3	2 / 3	
2026			0 / 36	0 / 56	0 / 6
