= Temiang =

Political subdivision in Malaysia

Temiang (N12)
Negeri Sembilan constituency

State constituency
- Legislature: Negeri Sembilan State Legislative Assembly
MLA
Ho Weng Wah
PH
- Constituency created: 1994
- First contested: 1995
- Last contested: 2026

Demographics
- Electors (2023): 13,085

N12 Temiang within Negeri Sembilan, as used for the 2023 and 2026 state elections

Temiang (Chinese: 沉香肚; pinyin: Chénxiāngdù; Jyutping: cam^{4}hoeng^{1}tou^{5}) is a state constituency in Negeri Sembilan, Malaysia, that has been represented in the Negeri Sembilan State Legislative Assembly.

The state constituency was first contested in 1995 and is mandated to return a single Assemblyman to the Negeri Sembilan State Legislative Assembly under the first-past-the-post voting system.

== Demographics ==
Ethnic breakdown of Temiang's electorate as of 2026
1. Chinese (43.3%)
2. Malay (39.3%)
3. Indian (14.6%)
4. Other ethnicities (2.70%)

== History ==
=== Polling districts ===
According to the federal gazette issued on 23 July 2026, the Temiang constituency is divided into 5 polling districts.

State constituency	Polling district	Code	Location
Temiang (N12)	Taman Temiang Jaya	128/12/01	SMA Sheikh Haji Mohd Said
Temiang (N12)	Temiang	128/12/02	SMJK Chan Wa
Temiang (N12)	Limbok	128/12/03	SK Temiang
Temiang (N12)	Jalan Yazid Ahmad	128/12/04	Sekolah Sri Seremban
Temiang (N12)	Jalan Han Hui Foong	128/12/05	SK Dato Klana Maamor

=== Representation history ===
Members of Assembly for Temiang
Assembly	No	Years	Name	Party
Constituency created from Mambau, Labu and Ampangan
9th	N24	1995-1999	Lee Yuen Fong (李银芳)	DAP
10th	N24	1999-2004	Lee Yuen Fong (李银芳)	BN (MCA)
11th	N12	2004-2008	Lee Yuen Fong (李银芳)	BN (MCA)
12th	N12	2008-2013	Ng Chin Tsai (吴金财)	PR (DAP)
13th	N12	2013-2018	Ng Chin Tsai (吴金财)	PR (DAP)
14th	N12	2018-2023	Ng Chin Tsai (吴金财)	PH (DAP)
15th	N12	2023–2026	Ng Chin Tsai (吴金财)	PH (DAP)
16th	N12	2026–present	Ho Weng Wah (何永铧)	PH (DAP)

== Election results ==
Negeri Sembilan state election, 2026: Temiang
Party	Candidate	Votes	%	∆%
PH	Ho Weng Wah	5,249	57.50	▼6.00
BN	Leaw Kok Chan	3,366	36.87	▲36.87
BERSATU	Fazly Hamid	514	5.63	▲5.63
Total valid votes		9,129	100.00	
Total rejected ballots		70		
Unreturned ballots		9		
Turnout		9,208	71.12	▲1.81
Registered electors		12,947		
Majority		1,883	20.63	▼13.49
PH hold		Swing		

Negeri Sembilan state election, 2023: Temiang
Party	Candidate	Votes	%	∆%
PH	Ng Chin Tsai	5,710	63.50	▲63.80
PN	Chang Er Chu	2,642	29.38	▲29.38
MUDA	Qusyairy Ahmad @ Ahmad Qusyairi Abdul Rahim	640	7.12	▲7.12
Total valid votes		8,992	100.00	
Total rejected ballots		63		
Unreturned ballots		14		
Turnout		9,061	69.31	▼13.25
Registered electors		13,085		
Majority		3,068	34.12	▲0.44
PH hold		Swing		

Negeri Sembilan state election, 2018: Temiang
Party	Candidate	Votes	%	∆%
PKR	Ng Chin Tsai	5,894	64.81	▲64.81
BN	Siow Koi Voon	2,831	31.13	▼9.83
PAS	Yaw Con Seng	369	4.06	▲4.06
Total valid votes		9,094	100.00	
Total rejected ballots		120		
Unreturned ballots		20		
Turnout		9,234	82.56	▼2.76
Registered electors		11,184		
Majority		3,063	33.68	▲15.60
PKR hold		Swing		

Negeri Sembilan state election, 2013: Temiang
Party	Candidate	Votes	%	∆%
DAP	Ng Chin Tsai	5,478	59.04	▼0.20
BN	Jason Lee Kee Chong	3,801	40.96	▲0.20
Total valid votes		9,279	100.00	
Total rejected ballots		196		
Unreturned ballots		19		
Turnout		9,494	85.32	▲9.35
Registered electors		11,127		
Majority		1,677	18.08	▼0.40
DAP hold		Swing		

Negeri Sembilan state election, 2008: Temiang
Party	Candidate	Votes	%	∆%
DAP	Ng Chin Tsai	4,290	59.24	▲15.41
BN	Jason Lee Kee Chong	2,952	40.76	▼15.41
Total valid votes		7,242	100.00	
Total rejected ballots		174		
Unreturned ballots		66		
Turnout		7,482	75.97	▲3.95
Registered electors		9,848		
Majority		1,338	18.48	▲6.12
DAP gain from BN		Swing		?

Negeri Sembilan state election, 2004: Temiang
Party	Candidate	Votes	%	∆%
BN	Lee Yuen Fong	4,179	56.18	▲5.49
DAP	Yap Yew Weng	3,260	43.82	▼5.49
Total valid votes		7,439	100.00	
Total rejected ballots		198		
Unreturned ballots		46		
Turnout		7,683	72.03	▲0.72
Registered electors		10,667		
Majority		919	12.35	▲10.97
BN hold		Swing		

Negeri Sembilan state election, 1999: Temiang
Party	Candidate	Votes	%	∆%
BN	Lee Yuen Fong	6,467	50.69	▲3.77
DAP	Dennis Chen Man Hin	6,291	49.31	▼3.77
Total valid votes		12,758	100.00	
Total rejected ballots		263		
Unreturned ballots		16		
Turnout		13,037	71.31	▼0.94
Registered electors		18,282		
Majority		176	1.38	▼4.78
BN gain from DAP		Swing		-

Negeri Sembilan state election, 1995: Temiang
Party	Candidate	Votes	%
DAP	Lee Yuen Fong	6,190	53.08
BN	Ho Yok Kee	5,472	46.92
Total valid votes		11,662	100.00
Total rejected ballots		217	
Unreturned ballots		11	
Turnout		11,890	72.25
Registered electors		16,457	
Majority		718	6.16
This was a new constituency created.
