= Yek Diew Ching =

Malaysian politician

Yang Berbahagia Dato' Yek Diew Ching DBNS
- 叶朝政

Member of the Negeri Sembilan State Legislative Assembly for Chuah
- In office 9 May 2018 – 12 August 2023
- Preceded by: Chai Tong Chai (PR–PKR)
- Succeeded by: Yew Boon Lye (PH–PKR)
- Majority: 3,201 (2018)

Personal details
- Party: People's Justice Party (PKR)
- Other political affiliations: Pakatan Harapan (PH)
- Occupation: Politician

Yek Diew Ching is a Malaysian politician who has served as a Member of the Negeri Sembilan State Legislative Assembly for Chuah state constituency from May 2018 to August 2023.

== Election results ==
Negeri Sembilan State Legislative Assembly
Year	Constituency	Candidate	Votes	Pct	Opponent(s)	Votes	Pct	Ballots cast	Majority	Turnout
2018	N29 Chuah	Yek Diew Ching (PKR)	6,661	65.81%	Lim Chin Fui (MCA)	3,460	34.19%	10,305	3,201	85.29%

== Honours ==
- Negeri Sembilan
  - Knight of the Order of Loyal Service to Negeri Sembilan (DBNS) – Dato' (2021)
