= Chuah (state constituency) =

Political subdivision in Negeri Sembilan, Malaysia

Chuah (N29)
Negeri Sembilan constituency

State constituency
- Legislature: Negeri Sembilan State Legislative Assembly
MLA
Yew Boon Lye
PH
- Constituency created: 2003
- First contested: 2004
- Last contested: 2026

Demographics
- Electors (2023): 15,095

N29 Chuah within Negeri Sembilan, as used for the 2023 and 2026 state elections

Chuah is a state constituency in Negeri Sembilan, Malaysia, that has been represented in the Negeri Sembilan State Legislative Assembly.

The state constituency was first contested in 2004 and is mandated to return a single Assemblyman to the Negeri Sembilan State Legislative Assembly under the first-past-the-post voting system.

== Demographics ==
Ethnic breakdown of Chuah's electorate as of 2026.
1. Chinese (53.4%)
2. Malay (24.8%)
3. Indian (21.1%)
4. Other ethnicities (0.80%)

== History ==
=== Polling districts ===
According to the gazette issued on 23 July 2026, the Chuah constituency has a total of 5 polling districts.

State constituency	Polling districts	Code	Location
Chuah（N29）	Tanah Merah	132/29/01	SJK (T) Ladang Tanah Merah; SJK (C) Kampung Baru Tanah Merah Site A; SMK Tanah Merah
Chuah（N29）	Kampung Pachitan	132/29/02	SK Kg Sawah
Chuah（N29）	Bukit Pelandok	132/29/03	SJK (C) Yik Chiao
Chuah（N29）	Sungai Nipah	132/29/04	SJK (C) Kg Baru Sg Nipah
Chuah（N29）	Chuah	132/29/05	SMA Chuah

=== Representation history ===
Members of the Legislative Assembly for Chuah
Assembly	No	Years	Member	Party
Constituency created from Lukut
11th	N29	2004-2008	Foo Ming Chee (符明治)	BN (MCA)
12th	N29	2008-2013	Chai Tong Chai (蔡同财)	PR (PKR)
13th	N29	2013-2015	Chai Tong Chai (蔡同财)	PR (PKR)
13th	N29	2015-2018	Chai Tong Chai (蔡同财)	PH (PKR)
14th	N29	2018–2023	Yek Diew Ching (叶朝政)	PH (PKR)
15th	N29	2023–2026	Yew Boon Lye (杨文來)	PH (PKR)
16th	N29	2026–present	Yew Boon Lye (杨文來)	PH (PKR)

== Election results ==
Negeri Sembilan state election, 2026
Party	Candidate	Votes	%	∆%
PH	Yew Boon Lye	6,621	61.80	▼19.55
BN	Pau Jeou Ching	4,092	38.20	▲38.20
Total valid votes		10,713	100.00	
Total rejected ballots		115		
Unreturned ballots		9		
Turnout		10,837	71.63	▲4.33
Registered electors		15,129		
Majority		2,529	23.61	▼39.09
PH hold		Swing		

Negeri Sembilan state election, 2023
Party	Candidate	Votes	%	∆%
PH	Yew Boon Lye	8,172	81.35	▲81.35
PN	Tang Jay Son	1,874	18.65	▲18.65
Total valid votes		10,046	100.00	
Total rejected ballots		101		
Unreturned ballots		12		
Turnout		10,159	67.30	▼17.99
Registered electors		15,095		
Majority		6,298	62.70	▲31.08
PH hold		Swing		

Negeri Sembilan state election, 2018
Party	Candidate	Votes	%	∆%
PKR	Yek Diew Ching	6,661	65.81	▲2.30
BN	Lim Chin Fui	3,460	34.19	▼2.30
Total valid votes		10,121	100.00	
Total rejected ballots		165		
Unreturned ballots		19		
Turnout		10,305	85.29	▲0.44
Registered electors		12,083		
Majority		3,201	31.62	▲4.60
PKR hold		Swing		

Negeri Sembilan state election, 2013
Party	Candidate	Votes	%	∆%
PKR	Chai Tong Chai	5,957	63.51	▲4.69
BN	Lim Chin Fui	3,423	36.49	▼4.69
Total valid votes		9,380	100.00	
Total rejected ballots		150		
Unreturned ballots		9		
Turnout		9,539	85.73	▲10.12
Registered electors		11,127		
Majority		2,534	27.02	▲9.38
PKR hold		Swing		
Source(s) "Federal Government Gazette - Notice of Contested Election, State Legislative Assembly for the State of Negeri Sembilan [P.U. (B) 193/2013]" (PDF). Attorney General's Chambers of Malaysia. 26 April 2013. "Federal Government Gazette - Results of Contested Election and Statements of the Poll after the Official Addition of Votes, State Constituencies for the State of Negeri Sembilan [P.U. (B) 234/2013]" (PDF). Attorney General's Chambers of Malaysia. 22 May 2013.

Negeri Sembilan state election, 2008
Party	Candidate	Votes	%	∆%
PKR	Chai Tong Chai	4,415	58.82	▲29.92
BN	Foo Ming Chee	3,091	41.18	▼29.92
Total valid votes		7,506	100.00	
Total rejected ballots		164		
Unreturned ballots		113		
Turnout		7,681	75.61	▲0.19
Registered electors		10,159		
Majority		1,324	17.64	▼25.56
PKR gain from BN		Swing		?

Negeri Sembilan state election, 2004
Party	Candidate	Votes	%
BN	Foo Ming Chee	5,276	72.10
PKR	AP Manam Sahardin	2,042	28.90
Total valid votes		7,318	100.00
Total rejected ballots		197	
Unreturned ballots		0	
Turnout		7,515	75.42
Registered electors		10,402	
Majority		3,234	43.20
This was a new constituency created.
