= Paroi (state constituency) =

Political subdivision in Negeri Sembilan, Malaysia

Paroi (N25)
Negeri Sembilan constituency

State constituency
- Legislature: Negeri Sembilan State Legislative Assembly
MLA
Kamarol Ridzuan Mohd Zain
PN
- Constituency created: 2003
- First contested: 2004
- Last contested: 2026

Demographics
- Electors (2023): 60,704

N25 Paroi within Negeri Sembilan, as used for the 2023 and 2026 state elections

Paroi is a state constituency in Negeri Sembilan, Malaysia, that has been represented in the Negeri Sembilan State Legislative Assembly.

The state constituency was first contested in 2004 and is mandated to return a single Assemblyman to the Negeri Sembilan State Legislative Assembly under the first-past-the-post voting system.

== Demographics ==
Ethnic breakdown of Paroi's electorate as of 2026.
1. Malay (78.7%)
2. Indian (14.4%)
3. Chinese (5.70%)
4. Other ethnicities (1.10%)

== History ==
=== Polling districts ===
According to the gazette issued on 23 July 2026, the Paroi constituency has a total of 10 polling districts.

State constituency	Polling districts	Code	Location
Paroi（N25）	Paroi	131/25/01	SK Paroi
Paroi（N25）	Taman Satria	131/25/02	SK Taman Seri Pagi; SMK Seri Pagi; SA Rakyat Bestari Taman Rasa Sayang
Paroi（N25）	Taman Tuanku Jaafar	131/25/03	SK Taman Tuanku Jaafar 2; SMK Taman Tuanku Jaafar
Paroi（N25）	Taman Sri Permata	131/25/04	Sekolah Dato' Abdul Razak
Paroi（N25）	Kombok	131/25/05	SJK (T) Ladang Kombok
Paroi（N25）	Taman Tasik Jaya	131/25/06	SK Taman Tasik Jaya; Dewan Orang Ramai Taman Tasik Jaya
Paroi（N25）	Bukit Seri Senawang	131/25/07	SJK (T) Ladang Senawang; SJK (T) Ladang Seremban; SK Taman Tuanku Jaafar
Paroi（N25）	Taman Kobena	131/25/08	SK Senawang 3; Tabika Perpaduan Taman Desa Ixora
Paroi（N25）	Senawang Jaya	131/25/09	SK Senawang; SK Lavender Height
Paroi（N25）	Taman Marida	131/25/10	SMK Senawang; SA As-Sa'idiyyah

=== Representation history ===
Members of the Legislative Assembly for Paroi
Assembly	No	Years	Member	Party
Constituency created from Senawang
11th	N25	2004-2008	Bibi Sharliza Mohd Khalid	BN (UMNO)
12th	N25	2008-2013	Mohamad Taufek Abd. Ghani	PR (PAS)
13th	N25	2013-2018	Mohd Ghazali Wahid	BN (UMNO)
14th	N25	2018–2023	Mohamad Taufek Abd Ghani	PH (AMANAH)
15th	N25	2023–2026	Kamarol Ridzuan Mohd Zain	PN (PAS)
16th	N25	2026–present	Kamarol Ridzuan Mohd Zain	PN (PAS)

== Election results ==
Negeri Sembilan state election, 2026
Party	Candidate	Votes	%	∆%
PN	Kamarol Ridzuan Mohd Zain	32,004	64.98	▲9.65
PH	Ahmad Shahir Ahmad Shah	15,045	30.55	▼11.93
BERSATU	Mohd Nazree Mohd Yunus	2,205	4.48	▲4.48
Total valid votes		49,254	100.00	
Total rejected ballots		461		
Unreturned ballots		70		
Turnout		49,785	76.59	▲4.97
Registered electors		64,998		
Majority		16,959	34.43	▲21.58
PN hold		Swing		

Negeri Sembilan state election, 2023
Party	Candidate	Votes	%	∆%
PN	Kamarol Ridzuan Mohd Zain	23,840	55.33	▲55.33
PH	Norwani Ahmad	18,301	42.48	▲42.48
Independent	Syakir Fitri	944	2.19	▲2.19
Total valid votes		43,085	100.00	
Total rejected ballots		299		
Unreturned ballots		91		
Turnout		43,475	71.62	▼16.27
Registered electors		60,704		
Majority		5,539	12.85	▲4.93
PN gain from PKR		Swing		?

Negeri Sembilan state election, 2018
Party	Candidate	Votes	%	∆%
PKR	Mohamad Taufek Abd Ghani	16,038	52.18	▲52.18
BN	Mohd Ghazali Abd Wahid	11,197	36.43	▼17.53
PAS	Masita Mohamed Ali	3,499	11.39	▼34.65
Total valid votes		30,734	100.00	
Total rejected ballots		273		
Unreturned ballots		173		
Turnout		31,180	86.10	▼1.79
Registered electors		36,213		
Majority		4,841	15.75	▲7.83
PKR gain from BN		Swing		?

Negeri Sembilan state election, 2013
Party	Candidate	Votes	%	∆%
BN	Mohd Ghazali Abd. Wahid	14,896	53.96	▲7.08
PAS	Mohamad Taufek Abd. Ghani	12,712	46.04	▼7.08
Total valid votes		27,608	100.00	
Total rejected ballots		230		
Unreturned ballots		167		
Turnout		28,005	87.89	▲9.50
Registered electors		31,862		
Majority		2,184	7.92	▲1.68
BN gain from PAS		Swing		?
Source(s) "Federal Government Gazette - Notice of Contested Election, State Legislative Assembly for the State of Negeri Sembilan [P.U. (B) 193/2013]" (PDF). Attorney General's Chambers of Malaysia. 26 April 2013. "Federal Government Gazette - Results of Contested Election and Statements of the Poll after the Official Addition of Votes, State Constituencies for the State of Negeri Sembilan [P.U. (B) 234/2013]" (PDF). Attorney General's Chambers of Malaysia. 22 May 2013.

Negeri Sembilan state election, 2008
Party	Candidate	Votes	%	∆%
PAS	Mohamad Taufek Abd. Ghani	9,423	53.12	▲21.89
BN	Zaharudin Mohd Shariff	8,316	46.88	▼21.89
Total valid votes		17,739	100.00	
Total rejected ballots		299		
Unreturned ballots		38		
Turnout		18,076	78.39	▲2.69
Registered electors		23,060		
Majority		1,107	6.24	▼31.30
PAS gain from BN		Swing		?

Negeri Sembilan state election, 2004
Party	Candidate	Votes	%
BN	Bibi Sharliza Mohd Khalid	7,524	68.77
PAS	Rosli Yaakop	3,417	31.23
Total valid votes		10,941	100.00
Total rejected ballots		249	
Unreturned ballots		60	
Turnout		11,250	75.70
Registered electors		14,862	
Majority		4,107	37.54
This was a new constituency created.
