= Mohamad Taufek Abd Ghani =

Malaysian politician

Yang Berbahagia Dato' Mohamad Taufek Abd Ghani DPNS
- محمد توفيق بن عبدالغاني

Member of the Negeri Sembilan State Executive Council (Youth & Sports)
- In office 23 May 2018 – 14 August 2023
- Monarch: Muhriz
- Menteri Besar: Aminuddin Harun
- Preceded by: Zaifulbahri Idris
- Succeeded by: Mustapha Nagoor
- Constituency: Paroi

Member of the Negeri Sembilan State Legislative Assembly for Paroi
- In office 9 May 2018 – 12 August 2023
- Preceded by: Mohd Ghazali Abd Wahid (BN–UMNO)
- Succeeded by: Kamarol Ridzuan Mohd Zain (PN–PAS)
- Majority: 4,841 (2018)
- In office 8 March 2008 – 5 May 2013
- Preceded by: Bibi Sharliza Mohd Khalid (BN–UMNO)
- Succeeded by: Mohd Ghazali Abd Wahid (BN–UMNO)
- Majority: 1,107 (2008)

Faction represented in Negeri Sembilan State Legislative Assembly
- 2008–2013: Malaysian Islamic Party
- 2018–2023: Pakatan Harapan

Personal details
- Born: Mohamad Taufek bin Abd Ghani; 30 September 1968 (age 57) Rembau, Negeri Sembilan, Malaysia
- Party: Malaysian Islamic Party (PAS) (–2015); National Trust Party (AMANAH) (2015–2023); Independent (since 2023)
- Other political affiliations: Barisan Alternatif (BA) (1999–2004); Pakatan Rakyat (PR) (2008–2015); Pakatan Harapan (PH) (2015–2023)
- Spouse: Mahani Musa
- Children: 4 (including Muhammad Syukri and Muhammad Sobri)
- Occupation: Politician

Mohamad Taufek bin Abd Ghani (born 30 September 1968) is a Malaysian politician who served as Member of the Negeri Sembilan State Executive Council (EXCO) in the Pakatan Harapan (PH) state administration under Menteri Besar Aminuddin Harun from May 2018 to August 2023 and Member of the Negeri Sembilan State Legislative Assembly (MLA) for Paroi from March 2008 to May 2013 and again from May 2018 to August 2023. He is an independent. He was a member of the National Trust Party (AMANAH), a component party of the PH coalition and the Malaysian Islamic Party (PAS), a component party of the Pakatan Rakyat (PR) coalition.

== Early life ==
Mohamad Taufek was born on 30 September 1968. He is from Kampung Pulau Bintongan, Rembau, Negeri Sembilan.

== Family ==
He married Mahani Musa who is a teacher and had 4 children with her. Among the 4 children is a pair of twins, Muhammad Syukri and Muhammad Sobri who were born in 1997.

== Education ==
Mohamad Taufek had his primary education at the King George V National Primary School, Seremban from 1975 to 1980, his secondary education at the King George V National Secondary School, Seremban from 1981 to 1983 and the MARA Junior College of Science, Seremban from 1984 to 1985. He furthered his studies at the matriculation level at the UKM Matriculation College, Kulim from 1986 to 1987 before having his tertiary education for the Bachelor of Chemical Engineering at the National University of Malaysia (UKM). He completed his education in 1992.

== Politics ==
Mohamad Taufek has been actively involved in politics since he was studying. He served as the Head of the Special Duties Committee (EXCO), Student Welfare Department (JAKSA) Kamsis Ungku Omar from 1990 to 1991. He later took on the role of Member of the Representative Council Students (MPP) of UKM.

In 2003, he was appointed as the Information Chief of the PAS Negeri Sembilan Youth Council until 2005. Subsequently, in 2005, he was appointed as the Deputy Head of the PAS Negeri Sembilan Youth Council, as well as the Deputy Director of the PAS Negeri Sembilan Election Department. He served in both positions until 2007.

In 2007 until 2009, he was elected as the Head of the PAS Negeri Sembilan Youth Council. As a result, he was also given an invitation (responsibility) as the Chairman of Lajnah Perpaduan Nasional PAS Negeri Sembilan. He also serves as the Chairman of the Consumer and Environment Lajnah of the Central PAS Youth Council, as well as the EXCO of the Central PAS Youth Council.

In 2009, he continued to climb the ladder of change after being appointed Deputy Commissioner of PAS Negeri Sembilan. Apart from that, he also served as a Member of the PAS Central Committee after being appointed by the Central PAS Leadership after the PAS Election for the 2009-2011 session.

At the grassroots level, he was appointed as the President of PAS Kawasan Rembau, Negeri Sembilan in 2008.

On 12 June 2011, he was appointed as the new PAS Negeri Sembilan Commissioner. He received information on his appointment as the new Negeri Sembilan Commissioner to replace Zulkefly Mohamad Omar while on board to cross the Bosporus Strait in Istanbul, while joining the Malaysian delegation to Turkey to review the progress of the Turkish election.

== Work experience ==
He used to work as a Production Engineer at Hualon Corporation (M) Sdn Bhd which operated in Melaka from 1992 to 1995. In addition, he also worked as a Senior Engineer at Samsung Corning (M) Sdn Bhd which operates in Seremban, Negeri Sembilan.

During his tenure, he underwent work training in Korea (1996 & 2004) and served in Nepal, Korea and Bangladesh throughout 2004-2006.

== Involvement in society ==
=== Non-governmental organizations ===
He is active in community activities. He was the Deputy Chairman of Surau An-Nur, Kampung Pulau Bintongan, Rembau in 2001-2002. In 2006, he served as a Member of the Madrasah Committee of Tuan Haji Abdul Rahman Ali (Also known as Madarasah Kampung Selemak, Rembau) for two years (2007).

Other positions he held was the Chairman of the Space Club Malaysia Negeri Sembilan (2007-2008), member of the Yayasan Amal Malaysia (2006-2008), and member of the Core Committee for the Empowerment of Indonesia (2005-2008).

== Election results ==
Negeri Sembilan State Legislative Assembly
Year	Constituency	Candidate	Votes	Pct	Opponent(s)	Votes	Pct	Ballots cast	Majority	Turnout%
2008	N25 Paroi	Mohamad Taufek Abd Ghani (PAS)	9,423	53.12%	Zaharudin Mohd Shariff (UMNO)	8,316	46.88%	18,076	1,107	78.39%
2013	N25 Paroi	Mohamad Taufek Abd Ghani (PAS)	12,712	46.04%	Mohd Ghazali Abd Wahid (UMNO)	14,896	53.96%	27,838	2,184	87.90%
2018	N25 Paroi	Mohamad Taufek Abd Ghani (AMANAH)	16,038	52.19%	Mohd Ghazali Abd Wahid (UMNO)	11,197	36.43%	31,180	4,841	86.10%
2018	N25 Paroi	Mohamad Taufek Abd Ghani (AMANAH)	16,038	52.19%	Masita Mohamed Ali (PAS)	3,499	11.38%	31,180	4,841	86.10%

== Honours ==
- Negeri Sembilan
  - Knight Commander of the Order of Loyalty to Negeri Sembilan (DPNS) – Dato' (2020)
