= Mohd Faizal Ramli =

Malaysian politician

Yang Berhormat Dato' Mohd Faizal Ramli DPNS PMW JP MLA
- محمّد فيصل رملي

Member of the Negeri Sembilan State Executive Council

Heritage, Technology, Innovation and Digital
- In office 24 August 2023 – 27 April 2026
- Menteri Besar: Aminuddin Harun
- Constituency: Linggi

Member of the Negeri Sembilan State Legislative Assembly for Linggi
- Incumbent
- Assumed office 12 August 2023
- Preceded by: Abd Rahman Mohd Redza (BN–UMNO)
- Majority: 1,461 (2023)

Member of the Negeri Sembilan State Legislative Assembly for Bagan Pinang
- In office 2004–2008
- Preceded by: constituency established
- Succeeded by: Azman Mohammad Noor (BN–UMNO)
- Majority: 4,411 (2004)

Personal details
- Born: Mohd Faizal bin Ramli; 1971 (age 54–55)
- Party: United Malays National Organisation (UMNO)
- Other political affiliations: Barisan Nasional (BN)
- Occupation: Politician

Mohd Faizal bin Ramli is a Malaysian politician who served as Member of the Negeri Sembilan State Executive Council (EXCO) under the administration of Menteri Besar Aminuddin Harun since August 2023 and Member of the Negeri Sembilan Legislative Assembly for Linggi since August 2023 as well as Bagan Pinang from 2004 to 2008. He is a member and the Division Chief of Port Dickson of the United Malays National Organisation (UMNO), a component party of the Barisan Nasional (BN) coalition. He is also an appointed member of UMNO's Supreme Council since 2023.

== Election results ==
Negeri Sembilan State Legislative Assembly
Year	Constituency	Candidate	Votes	Pct	Opponent(s)	Votes	Pct	Ballots cast	Majority	Turnout
2004	N31 Bagan Pinang	Mohd Faizal Ramli (UMNO)	5,967	79.31%	Hassan Alias (PAS)	1,556	20.69%	8,022	4,411	71.59%
2023	N32 Linggi	Mohd Faizal Ramli (UMNO)	7,832	55.14%	Zambri Mat Said (BERSATU)	6,371	44.86%	14,551	1,461	70.31%

== Honours ==
- Federal Territory (Malaysia)
  - Commander of the Order of the Territorial Crown (PMW) – Datuk (2023)
- Negeri Sembilan
  - Knight Commander of the Order of Loyalty to Negeri Sembilan (DPNS) – Dato' (2026)
  - Member of the Order of Loyalty to Negeri Sembilan (ANS)
  - Justice of the Peace of Negeri Sembilan (JP)
