= Linggi (state constituency) =

Political subdivision in Malaysia

Linggi (N32)
Negeri Sembilan constituency

State constituency
- Legislature: Negeri Sembilan State Legislative Assembly
MLA
Mohd Faizal Ramli
BN
- Constituency created: 1959
- First contested: 1959
- Last contested: 2026

Demographics
- Electors (2026): 20,677

N32 Linggi within Negeri Sembilan, as used for the 2023 and 2026 state elections

Linggi is a state constituency in Negeri Sembilan, Malaysia, that has been represented in the Negeri Sembilan State Legislative Assembly.

The state constituency was first contested in 1959 and is mandated to return a single Assemblyman to the Negeri Sembilan State Legislative Assembly under the first-past-the-post voting system. This constituency are unique because it is located on two states with Tanjung Tuan are under jurisdiction of Malacca state but still voted for state constituency in Negeri Sembilan assembly.

== Demographics ==
Ethnic breakdown of Linggi's electorate as of 2026
1. Malay (61.8%)
2. Indian (17.3%)
3. Chinese (16.7%)
4. Other ethnicities (4.20%)

== History ==
=== Polling districts ===
According to the gazette issued on 23 July 2026, the Linggi constituency has a total of 8 polling districts.

State constituency	Polling districts	Code	Location
Linggi（N32）	Ayer Kuning	132/32/01	Balai Raya Kampung Barisan
Linggi（N32）	Linggi	132/32/02	SK Linggi
Linggi（N32）	Kampung Pengkalan Durian	132/32/03	Pusat Pemulihan Dalam Komuniti Cahaya Ikhsan Linggi
Linggi（N32）	Pengkalan Kempas	132/32/04	SK Permatang Pasir
Linggi（N32）	Ladang Sengkang	132/32/05	SJK (T) Ladang Sengkang
Linggi（N32）	Kampong Sungai Raya	132/32/06	SK Tanjong Agas
Linggi（N32）	Pasir Panjang	132/32/07	SJK (C) Chung Hua Pasir Panjang; Balai Raya Kampung Orang Asli Palebar Baru
Linggi（N32）	Bandar Baru Sunggala	132/32/08	SMA Telok Kemang; SMK Intan Perdana

=== Representation history ===
Member of the Legislative Assembly for Linggi
Parlimen	No	Tahun	Nama	Parti
Constituency created
1st	N16	1959-1964	Mohamed Said Muhammad	Alliance (UMNO)
2nd	N16	1964-1969	Mohamed Said Muhammad	Alliance (UMNO)
		1969-1971	Assembly was dissolved	
3rd	N16	1971-1974	Soorian Arjunan	DAP
4th	N20	1974-1978	Samad Said	BN (UMNO)
5th	N20	1978-1982	Mohd Isa Abdul Samad	BN (UMNO)
6th	N20	1982-1986	Mohd Isa Abdul Samad	BN (UMNO)
7th	N26	1986-1990	Mohd Isa Abdul Samad	BN (UMNO)
8th	N26	1990-1995	Mohd Isa Abdul Samad	BN (UMNO)
9th	N29	1995-1999	Mohd Isa Abdul Samad	BN (UMNO)
10th	N29	1999-2004	Mohd Isa Abdul Samad	BN (UMNO)
11th	N32	2004-2008	Ismail Taib	BN (UMNO)
12th	N32	2008-2013	Ismail Taib	BN (UMNO)
13th	N32	2013-2018	Abdul Rahman Mohd Redza	BN (UMNO)
14th	N32	2018-2023	Abdul Rahman Mohd Redza	BN (UMNO)
15th	N32	2023–2026	Mohd Faizal Ramli	BN (UMNO)
16th	N32	2026-present	Mohd Faizal Ramli	BN (UMNO)

== Election results ==
Negeri Sembilan state election, 2026
Party	Candidate	Votes	%	∆%
BN	Mohd Faizal Ramli	9,139	58.24	▲3.10
PH	Aminuddin Harun	6,163	39.27	▲39.27
BERSATU	Zamri Md Said	391	2.49	▲2.49
Total valid votes		15,693	100.00	
Total rejected ballots		232		
Unreturned ballots		9		
Turnout		15,934	77.06	▲6.75
Registered electors		20,677		
Majority		2,976	18.96	▲8.68
BN hold		Swing		

Negeri Sembilan state election, 2023
Party	Candidate	Votes	%	∆%
BN	Mohd Faizal Ramli	7,832	55.14	▲6.61
PN	Zamri Md Said	6,371	44.86	▲44.86
Total valid votes		14,203	100.00	
Total rejected ballots		98		
Unreturned ballots		250		
Turnout		14,551	70.31	▼12.18
Registered electors		20,696		
Majority		1,461	10.28	▲5.30
BN hold		Swing		

Negeri Sembilan state election, 2018
Party	Candidate	Votes	%	∆%
BN	Abdul Rahman Mohd Redza	6,072	48.53	▼14.55
PKR	Rusli Abdullah	5,449	43.55	▲6.63
PAS	Rizal Ishak	992	7.93	▲7.93
Total valid votes		12,513	100.00	
Total rejected ballots		298		
Unreturned ballots		47		
Turnout		12,858	82.49	▼2.96
Registered electors		15,588		
Majority		623	4.98	▼21.18
BN hold		Swing		

Negeri Sembilan state election, 2013
Party	Candidate	Votes	%	∆%
BN	Abdul Rahman Mohd Redza	7,859	63.08	▲4.74
PKR	Rosman Jonet	5,449	36.92	▼4.74
Total valid votes		12,458	100.00	
Total rejected ballots		263		
Unreturned ballots		33		
Turnout		12,754	85.45	▲8.25
Registered electors		14,926		
Majority		3,260	26.16	▲9.48
BN hold		Swing		

Negeri Sembilan state election, 2008
Party	Candidate	Votes	%	∆%
BN	Ismail Taib	5,510	58.34	▼20.85
PKR	Ramlan Roes	3,935	41.66	▲20.85
Total valid votes		9,445	100.00	
Total rejected ballots		296		
Unreturned ballots		72		
Turnout		9,813	77.20	▲2.15
Registered electors		12,711		
Majority		1,575	16.68	▼41.70
BN hold		Swing		

Negeri Sembilan state election, 2004
Party	Candidate	Votes	%	∆%
BN	Ismail Taib	7,138	79.19	▲9.97
PKR	Mustafa Embok	1,876	20.81	▲20.81
Total valid votes		9,014	100.00	
Total rejected ballots		229		
Unreturned ballots		149		
Turnout		9,392	75.05	▲1.49
Registered electors		12,514		
Majority		5,262	58.38	▲19.94
BN hold		Swing		

Negeri Sembilan state election, 1999
Party	Candidate	Votes	%	∆%
BN	Mohd Isa Abdul Samad	5,543	69.22	▼18.53
PAS	Rosli Yaakop	2,465	30.78	▲30.78
Total valid votes		8,008	100.00	
Total rejected ballots		243		
Unreturned ballots		11		
Turnout		8,262	73.56	▼0.08
Registered electors		11,231		
Majority		3,078	38.44	▼43.09
BN hold		Swing		

Negeri Sembilan state election, 1995
Party	Candidate	Votes	%	∆%
BN	Mohd Isa Abdul Samad	6,807	87.75	▲7.15
S46	Mohd Nordin Ahmad	483	6.23	▼13.17
Independent	Mustapa Manap	467	6.02	▲6.02
Total valid votes		7,757	100.00	
Total rejected ballots		203		
Unreturned ballots		26		
Turnout		7,986	73.64	▼3.36
Registered electors		10,844		
Majority		6,324	81.53	▲20.32
BN hold		Swing		

Negeri Sembilan state election, 1990
Party	Candidate	Votes	%	∆%
BN	Mohd Isa Abdul Samad	5,447	80.60	
S46	Mohd Jorji Harun	1,311	19.40	
Total valid votes		6,758	100.00	
Total rejected ballots		223		
Unreturned ballots		7		
Turnout		6,988	77.00	▲77.00
Registered electors		9,075		
Majority		4,136	61.20	▲61.20
BN hold		Swing		

Negeri Sembilan state election, 1986
Party	Candidate	Votes	%	∆%
BN	Mohd Isa Abdul Samad			
Total valid votes				
Total rejected ballots				
Unreturned ballots				
Turnout				
Registered electors		8,696		
Majority				
BN hold		Swing		

Negeri Sembilan state election, 1982
Party	Candidate	Votes	%	∆%
On the nomination day, Mohd Isa Abdul Samad won uncontested.
BN	Mohd Isa Abdul Samad			
Total valid votes				
Total rejected ballots				
Unreturned ballots				
Turnout				
Registered electors		8,144		
Majority				
BN hold		Swing		

Negeri Sembilan state election, 1978
Party	Candidate	Votes	%	∆%
BN	Mohd Isa Abdul Samad	3,835	67.65	▼3.95
DAP	Wee King Song	1,445	25.49	▼0.05
PAS	Shamsudin Dewa	389	6.86	▲6.86
Total valid votes		5,669	100.00	
Total rejected ballots		192		
Unreturned ballots		0		
Turnout		5,861	80.75	▼2.46
Registered electors		7,258		
Majority		2,390	42.16	▼3.90
BN hold		Swing		

Negeri Sembilan state election, 1974
Party	Candidate	Votes	%	∆%
BN	Samad Said	3,678	71.60	▲26.21
DAP	Retna Ghandi	1,312	25.54	▼27.64
IPPP	Sulaiman Zainal	147	2.86	▲2.86
Total valid votes		5,137	100.00	
Total rejected ballots		231		
Unreturned ballots		0		
Turnout		5,368	83.21	▲0.18
Registered electors		6,451		
Majority		2,366	46.06	▲38.27
BN gain from DAP		Swing		-

Negeri Sembilan state election, 1969
Party	Candidate	Votes	%	∆%
DAP	Soorian Arjunan	1,672	53.18	▲53.18
Alliance	Abdul Rashid Mohamad	1,427	45.39	▼19.10
PCMB	Low Yeh Hong	45	1.43	▲1.43
Total valid votes		3,144	100.00	
Total rejected ballots		134		
Unreturned ballots		0		
Turnout		3,278	83.03	▲0.85
Registered electors		3,948		
Majority		245	7.79	▼21.19
DAP gain from Alliance		Swing		-

Negeri Sembilan state election, 1964
Party	Candidate	Votes	%	∆%
Alliance	Mohamed Said Mohamed	1,680	64.49	▲8.51
UDP	Ong Boon Hong	925	35.51	▲35.51
Total valid votes		2,605	100.00	
Total rejected ballots		203		
Unreturned ballots		0		
Turnout		2,808	82.18	▼1.35
Registered electors		3,417		
Majority		755	28.98	▲2.94
Alliance hold		Swing		

Negeri Sembilan state election, 1959
Party	Candidate	Votes	%
Alliance	Mohamed Said Mohamed	1,193	55.98
Independent	Teh Seng Sum	638	29.94
National Party	Tengku Syed Harun Tungku	300	14.08
Total valid votes		2,131	100.00
Total rejected ballots		55	
Unreturned ballots		0	
Turnout		2,186	83.53
Registered electors		2,617	
Majority		555	26.04
This was a new seat created.
