= Abdul Fatah Zakaria =

Malaysian politician

Yang Berhormat Tuan Abdul Fatah Zakaria BAT PPS PPA PJM MLA
- عبد الفتاح زكريا

Member of the Negeri Sembilan State Legislative Assembly for Bagan Pinang
- Incumbent
- Assumed office 12 August 2023
- Preceded by: Tun Hairuddin Abu Bakar (BN–UMNO)
- Majority: 3,426 (2023); 10,137 (2026)

Division Chairman of PAS of the Port Dickson
- Incumbent
- Assumed office 2019
- State Commissioner: Rafiei Mustapha
- Preceded by: Mahfuz Roslan

Personal details
- Party: Malaysian Islamic Party (PAS)
- Other political affiliations: Perikatan Nasional (PN) (2020–present)
- Occupation: Politician, retire military officer

Abdul Fatah bin Zakaria is a Malaysian politician who served as Member of the Negeri Sembilan State Legislative Assembly (MLA) for Bagan Pinang since August 2023. He is a member of Malaysian Islamic Party (PAS), a component party of Perikatan Nasional (PN).

Abdul Fatah is a retired military man who has lived for over 26 years in Army City, Port Dickson.

== Election results ==
Negeri Sembilan State Legislative Assembly
Year	Constituency	Candidate	Votes	Pct	Opponent(s)	Votes	Pct	Ballots cast	Majority	Turnout
2023	N31 Bagan Pinang	Abdul Fatah Zakaria (PAS)	10,921	59.30%	Mohd Najib Mohd Isa (UMNO)	7,495	40.70%	21,031	3,426	75.68%
2026	N31 Bagan Pinang	Abdul Fatah Zakaria (PAS)	14,603	74.49%	Nasir bin Raman (AMANAH)	4,466	22.78%	20,084	10,137	73.16%
2026	N31 Bagan Pinang	Abdul Fatah Zakaria (PAS)	14,603	74.49%	Sheikh Junaidy bin Jamaludin (BERSATU)	536	2.73%	20,084	10,137	73.16%

== Honours ==
- Malaysia
  - Recipient of the Loyal Service Medal (PPS)
  - Recipient of the General Service Medal (PPA)
- Malaysian Armed Forces
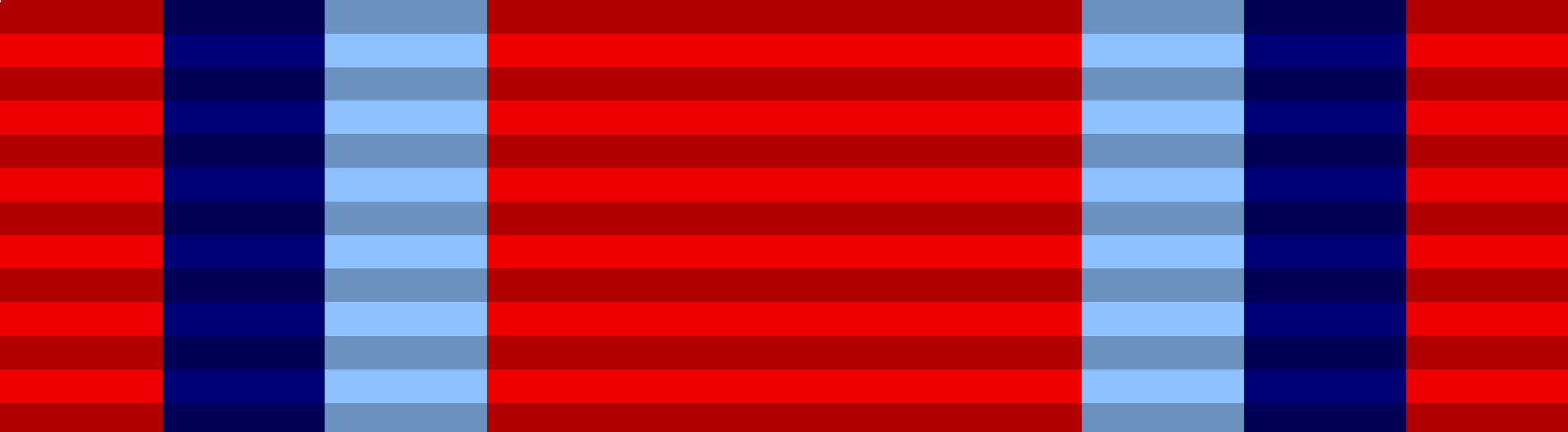
  - Herald of the Most Gallant Order of Military Service (BAT)
  - Recipient of the Malaysian Service Medal (PJM)
