= Seremban Jaya (state constituency) =

State constituency located in Negeri Sembilan

Seremban Jaya (N24)
Negeri Sembilan constituency

State constituency
- Legislature: Negeri Sembilan State Legislative Assembly
MLA
Mugunthan Subramaniam
PH
- Constituency created: 2018
- First contested: 2018
- Last contested: 2026

Demographics
- Electors (2026): 33,015

N24 Seremban Jaya within Negeri Sembilan, as used for the 2023 and 2026 state elections

Seremban Jaya is a state constituency in Negeri Sembilan, Malaysia, that has been represented in the Negeri Sembilan State Legislative Assembly.

The state constituency was first contested in 2018 and is mandated to return a single Assemblyman to the Negeri Sembilan State Legislative Assembly under the first-past-the-post voting system.

== Demographics ==
Ethnic breakdown of Seremban Jaya's electorate as of 2026
1. Chinese (45.5%)
2. Indian (27.9%)
3. Malay (25.1%)
4. Other ethnicities (1.50%)

== History ==
=== Polling districts ===
According to the federal gazette issued on 23 July 2026, the Seremban Jaya constituency is divided into 5 polling districts.

State constituency	Polling district	Code	Location
Seremban Jaya (N24)	Taman Rahang	130/24/01	Kolej Tingkatan Enam Tuanku Muhriz
Seremban Jaya (N24)	Taman Seremban	130/24/02	SJK (C) Forest Heights
Seremban Jaya (N24)	Kampong Bahru Rahang	130/24/03	SJK (C) Kg Baru Rahang
Seremban Jaya (N24)	Senawang	130/24/04	SK Taman Sri Mawar
Seremban Jaya (N24)	Taman Seremban Jaya	130/24/05	SK Seremban Jaya; SMK Seremban Jaya; SJK (C) Sungai Salak; SK Seremban Jaya 2; Dewan Orang Ramai Taman Seremban Jaya

=== Representation history ===
Members of Assembly for Seremban Jaya
Assembly	No	Years	Name	Party
Constituency created from Senawang, Ampangan, Paroi and Sikamat
14th	N24	2018-2023	Gunasekaren Palasamy	PH (DAP)
15th	N24	2023–2026	Gunasekaren Palasamy	PH (DAP)
16th	N24	2026–present	Mugunthan Subramaniam	PH (DAP)

== Election results ==
Negeri Sembilan state election, 2026
Party	Candidate	Votes	%	∆%
PH	Mugunthan Subramaniam	14,171	61.70	▼17.90
BN	Thinalan T Rajagopalu	8,470	36.88	▲36.88
BERSATU	Mahendran Ramasamy	327	1.42	▲1.42
Total valid votes		22,968	100.00	
Total rejected ballots		236		
Unreturned ballots		22		
Turnout		23,226	70.35	▲3.26
Registered electors		33,015		
Majority		5,701	24.82	▼34.38
PH hold		Swing		

Negeri Sembilan state election, 2023
Party	Candidate	Votes	%	∆%
PH	Gunasekaren Palasamy	17,080	79.60	▲79.60
PN	Gary Lee Ban Fatt	4,377	20.40	▲20.40
Total valid votes		21,457	100.00	
Total rejected ballots		171		
Unreturned ballots		36		
Turnout		21,664	67.09	▼17.40
Registered electors		32,290		
Majority		12,703	59.20	▼2.20
PH hold		Swing		

Negeri Sembilan state election, 2018
Party	Candidate	Votes	%
PKR	Gunasekaren Palasamy	13,760	80.41
BN	Choong Vee Hing	3,253	19.01
People's Alternative Party	Sagaya Rajan Xavier	99	0.58
Total valid votes		17,112	100.00
Total rejected ballots		168	
Unreturned ballots		96	
Turnout		17,376	84.49
Registered electors		20,565	
Majority		10,507	61.40
This was a new constituency created.
