= Sri Tanjung (state constituency) =

Electoral district in Negeri Sembilan, Malaysia

Sri Tanjung (N33)
Negeri Sembilan constituency

State constituency
- Legislature: Negeri Sembilan State Legislative Assembly
MLA
Rajasekaran Gunnasekaran
PH
- Constituency created: 2018
- First contested: 2018
- Last contested: 2026

Demographics
- Electors (2026): 19,590

N33 Sri Tanjung within Negeri Sembilan, as used for the 2023 and 2026 state elections

Sri Tanjung is a state constituency in Negeri Sembilan, Malaysia, that has been represented in the Negeri Sembilan State Legislative Assembly.

The state constituency was first contested in 2018 and is mandated to return a single Assemblyman to the Negeri Sembilan State Legislative Assembly under the first-past-the-post voting system.

== Demographics ==
Ethnic breakdown of Sri Tanjung's electorate as of 2026.
1. Malay (38.7%)
2. Chinese (31.3%)
3. Indian (27.1%)
4. Other ethnicities (2.90%)

== History ==
=== Polling districts ===
According to the gazette issued on 23 July 2026, the Sri Tanjong constituency has a total of 4 polling districts.

State constituency	Polling districts	Code	Location
Sri Tanjong（N33）	Kampung Paya	132/33/01	KV Port Dickson; SRA Taman Desa Permai
Sri Tanjong（N33）	Kampung Arab	132/33/02	SK Kampong Gelam
Sri Tanjong（N33）	Kampung Chokra	132/33/03	SJK (T) Port Dickson
Sri Tanjong（N33）	Pekan Port Dickson	132/33/04	SK Port Dickson; SMK Datuk Haji Abdul Samad

=== Representation history ===
Members of the Legislative Assembly for Sri Tanjung
Assembly	No	Years	Name	Party
Constituency created from Port Dickson and Bagan Pinang
14th	N33	2018-2023	Ravi Munusamy	PH (PKR)
15th	N33	2023–2026	Rajasekaran Gunnasekaran	PH (PKR)
16th	N33	2026–present	Rajasekaran Gunnasekaran	PH (PKR)

== Election results ==
Negeri Sembilan state election, 2026
Party	Candidate	Votes	%	∆%
PH	Rajasekaran Gunnasekaran	6,702	50.43	▼15.58
BN	Achutan Alagan	5,367	40.39	▲40.39
BERSATU	Leevineshwaran Murugan	618	4.65	▲4.65
Independent	Islah Wahyudi Zainudin	529	3.98	▲3.98
Independent	A. Saravanan	73	0.55	▲0.55
Total valid votes		13,289	100.00	
Total rejected ballots		128		
Unreturned ballots		10		
Turnout		13,427	68.54	▲3.70
Registered electors		19,590		
Majority		1,335	10.05	▼20.97
PH hold		Swing		

Negeri Sembilan state election, 2023
Party	Candidate	Votes	%	∆%
PH	Rajasekaran Gunnasekaran	8,239	66.01	▲66.01
PN	Zabidi Ariffin	4,243	34.99	▲34.99
Total valid votes		12,482	100.00	
Total rejected ballots		98		
Unreturned ballots		19		
Turnout		12,599	64.84	▼18.03
Registered electors		19,431		
Majority		3,996	31.02	▼3.24
PH hold		Swing		

Negeri Sembilan state election, 2018
Party	Candidate	Votes	%
PKR	Ravi Munusamy	7,366	62.62
BN	Thinalan T Rajagopalu	3,336	28.36
PAS	Kamarul Ridzuan Mohd Zain	1,061	9.02
Total valid votes		11,763	100.00
Total rejected ballots		159	
Unreturned ballots		0	
Turnout		11,952	82.87
Registered electors		14,422	
Majority		4,030	34.26
This was a new constituency created.
