= Rajasekaran Gunnasekaran =

Malaysian politician

Yang Berhormat Dato' Dr. Rajasekaran Gunnasekaran DBNS MLA
- ராஜசேகரன் குணசேகரன்

Member of the Negeri Sembilan State Legislative Assembly for Sri Tanjung
- Incumbent
- Assumed office 12 August 2023
- Preceded by: Ravi Munusamy (PH–PKR)
- Majority: 3,996 (2023)

Personal details
- Party: People's Justice Party (PKR)
- Other political affiliations: Pakatan Harapan (PH)
- Education: Crimea State Medical University (Doctor of Medicine)
- Occupation: Politician, doctor

Rajasekaran a/l Gunnasekaran is a Malaysian politician and doctor who served as Member of the Negeri Sembilan State Legislative Assembly (MLA) for Sri Tanjung since August 2023. He is a member of People's Justice Party (PKR), a component party of Pakatan Harapan (PH).

== Education ==
Rajasekaran Gunnasekaran holds a Doctor of Medicine from Crimea State Medical University.

== Political career ==
Rajasekaran Gunnasekaran is a member of the State Leadership Council (elected) of Negeri Sembilan of PKR.

=== ADUN for Sri Tanjung of Negeri Sembilan State Legislative Assembly (2023) ===
In the 2023 state election, Rajasekaran Gunnasekaran made his electoral debut after being nominated by PH to contest for the Sri Tanjung state seat. Rajasekaran contested against Zabidi Ariffin of Perikatan Nasional. He won the seat by gaining 8,239 votes with the majority of 3,996.

In December 2023, Rajasekaran helped a road accident victim while on his way to State Legislative Assembly.

== Election results ==
Negeri Sembilan State Legislative Assembly
Year	Constituency	Candidate	Votes	Pct	Opponent(s)	Votes	Pct	Ballots cast	Majority	Turnout
2023	N33 Sri Tanjung	Rajasekaran Gunnasekaran (PKR)	8,239	66.01%	Zabidi Ariffin (BERSATU)	4,243	34.99%	12,599	3,996	64.84%

== Honours ==
- Negeri Sembilan
  - Knight of the Order of Loyal Service to Negeri Sembilan (DBNS) – Dato' (2026)
