= Ravi Munusamy =

Malaysian politician

Yang Berbahagia Dato' Ravi Munusamy DBNS
- ரவி முனுசாமி

Deputy Speaker of the Negeri Sembilan State Legislative Assembly
- In office 2 July 2018 – 1 July 2023
- Monarch: Muhriz
- Menteri Besar: Aminuddin Harun
- Speaker: Zulkefly Mohamad Omar
- Preceded by: Position established
- Succeeded by: Position abolished
- Constituency: Sri Tanjung

Member of the Negeri Sembilan State Legislative Assembly for Sri Tanjung
- In office 9 May 2018 – 12 August 2023
- Preceded by: Position established
- Succeeded by: Rajasekaran Gunnasekaran (PH–PKR)
- Majority: 4,030 (2018)

Member of the Negeri Sembilan State Legislative Assembly for Port Dickson
- In office 8 March 2008 – 9 May 2018
- Preceded by: Rajagopalu Thamotharapillay (BN–MIC)
- Succeeded by: Position abolished
- Majority: 733 (2008); 2,422 (2013)

Personal details
- Born: Ravi a/l Munusamy; 27 July 1967 (age 59) Negeri Sembilan, Malaysia
- Citizenship: Malaysian
- Party: People's Justice Party (PKR)
- Other political affiliations: Pakatan Rakyat (PR) (2008–2015); Pakatan Harapan (PH) (since 2015)
- Occupation: Politician

Ravi a/l Munusamy is a Malaysian politician who served as Deputy Speaker of the Negeri Sembilan State Legislative Assembly from July 2018 to July 2023 and Member of the Legislative Assembly (MLA) for Sri Tanjung from May 2018 to August 2023 as well as Port Dickson from March 2008 to May 2018. He is a member of the People's Justice Party (PKR), a component party of the Pakatan Harapan (PH) and formerly Pakatan Rakyat (PR) coalitions.

== Election results ==
Negeri Sembilan State Legislative Assembly
| Year | Constituency | Candidate | Votes | Pct | Opponent(s) | Votes | Pct | Ballots cast | Majority | Turnout |
|---|---|---|---|---|---|---|---|---|---|---|
| 2008 | N33 Port Dickson | Ravi Munusamy (PKR) | 4,475 | 53.19% | Rajagopalu Thamotharapillay (MIC) | 3,742 | 44.48% | 8,617 | 733 | 72.73% |
| 2008 | N33 Port Dickson | Ravi Munusamy (PKR) | 4,475 | 53.19% | Jeeva Kumar Marimuthu (IND) | 196 | 2.33% | 8,617 | 733 | 72.73% |
| 2013 | N33 Port Dickson | Ravi Munusamy (PKR) | 6,709 | 60.63% | Tanaletchumy Palanisamy (MIC) | 4,287 | 38.74% | 11,268 | 2,422 | 82.80% |
| 2013 | N33 Port Dickson | Ravi Munusamy (PKR) | 6,709 | 60.63% | Daniel Simon (IND) | 70 | 0.63% | 11,268 | 2,422 | 82.80% |
| 2018 | N33 Sri Tanjung | Ravi Munusamy (PKR) | 6,072 | 58.00% | Thinalan Rajagopalu (MIC) | 3,336 | 31.87% | 11,952 | 4,030 | 82.90% |
| 2018 | N33 Sri Tanjung | Ravi Munusamy (PKR) | 6,072 | 58.00% | Kamarol Ridzuan Mohd Zain (PAS) | 1,061 | 10.13% | 11,952 | 4,030 | 82.90% |

== Honours ==
- Negeri Sembilan
  - Knight of the Order of Loyal Service to Negeri Sembilan (DBNS) – Dato' (2020)
