= Yew Boon Lye =

Malaysian politician

Yang Berhormat Dato' Yew Boon Lye DBNS MLA

Member of the Negeri Sembilan State Legislative Assembly for Chuah
- Incumbent
- Assumed office 12 August 2023
- Preceded by: Yek Diew Ching (PH–PKR)
- Majority: 6,298 (2023)

Personal details
- Born: 7 July 1971 (age 54)
- Party: People's Justice Party (PKR)
- Other political affiliations: Pakatan Harapan (PH)
- Occupation: Politician

Yew Boon Lye is a Malaysian politician who has served as a Member of the Negeri Sembilan State Legislative Assembly (MLA) for Chuah since August 2023. He is a member of People's Justice Party (PKR), a component party of Pakatan Harapan (PH).

== Election results ==
Negeri Sembilan State Legislative Assembly
Year	Constituency	Candidate	Votes	Pct	Opponent(s)	Votes	Pct	Ballots cast	Majority	Turnout
2023	N29 Chuah	Yew Boon Lye (PKR)	8,172	81.35%	Tang Jay Son (GERAKAN)	1,874	18.65%	10,159	6,298	67.30%

== Honours ==
- Negeri Sembilan
  - Knight of the Order of Loyal Service to Negeri Sembilan (DBNS) – Dato' (2026)
