= Tun Hairuddin Abu Bakar =

Malaysian politician

Yang Berbahagia Dato' Tun Hairuddin Abu Bakar DPNS JP
- تون حيرالدين بن أبو بكر

Member of the Negeri Sembilan State Executive Council (Tourism)
- In office 22 May 2013 – 12 May 2018
- Monarch: Muhriz
- Menteri Besar: Mohamad Hasan
- Preceded by: Mohammad Razi Kail
- Succeeded by: Aminuddin Harun
- Constituency: Bagan Pinang

Member of the Negeri Sembilan State Legislative Assembly for Bagan Pinang
- In office 5 May 2013 – 12 August 2023
- Preceded by: Mohd Isa Abdul Samad (BN–UMNO)
- Succeeded by: Abdul Fatah Zakaria (PN–PAS)
- Majority: 6,067 (2013); 1,935 (2018)

Faction represented in Negeri Sembilan State Legislative Assembly
- 2013–2023: Barisan Nasional

Personal details
- Born: Negeri Sembilan, Malaysia
- Citizenship: Malaysian
- Party: United Malays National Organisation (UMNO)
- Other political affiliations: Barisan Nasional (BN)
- Occupation: Politician

Tun Hairuddin bin Abu Bakar is a Malaysian politician who had served as Member of the Negeri Sembilan State Executive Council (EXCO) in the Barisan Nasional (BN) state administration under former Menteri Besar Mohamad Hasan from May 2013 to the collapse of the BN state administration in May 2018 and Member of the Negeri Sembilan State Legislative Assembly (MLA) for Bagan Pinang from May 2013 to August 2023. He is a member of the United Malays National Organisation (UMNO), a component party of the BN coalition.

== Election results ==
Negeri Sembilan State Legislative Assembly
Year	Constituency	Candidate	Votes	Pct	Opponent(s)	Votes	Pct	Ballots cast	Majority	Turnout
2013	N31 Bagan Pinang	Tun Hairuddin Abu Bakar (UMNO)	10,206	71.15%	Ramli Ismail (PAS)	4,139	28.85%	14,720	6,067	84.90%
2018	N31 Bagan Pinang	Tun Hairuddin Abu Bakar (UMNO)	7,146	57.83%	Rashid Latiff (BERSATU)	5,211	42.17%	12,767	1,935	80.70%

== Honours ==
- Negeri Sembilan
  - Knight Commander of the Order of Loyalty to Negeri Sembilan (DPNS) – Dato' (2015)
  - Justice of the Peace (JP) (2008)
