= Ng Chin Tsai =

Malaysian politician

Yang Berhormat Tuan Ng Chin Tsai MLA
- 吴金财

Member of the Negeri Sembilan State Legislative Assembly for Temiang
- In office 8 March 2008 – 1 August 2026
- Preceded by: Lee Yuen Fong (BN–MCA)
- Succeeded by: Ho Weng Wah (PH–DAP)
- Majority: 1,338 (2008); 1,677 (2013); 3,063 (2018); 3,068 (2023)

Personal details
- Born: Ng Chin Tsai Seremban, Negeri Sembilan
- Party: Democratic Action Party (DAP)
- Other political affiliations: Pakatan Rakyat (PR) (2008–2015); Pakatan Harapan (PH) (since 2015)
- Occupation: Politician

Ng Chin Tsai is a Malaysian politician who served as a Member of the Negeri Sembilan State Legislative Assembly (MLA) for Temiang from March 2008 to August 2026. He is a Democratic Action Party (DAP), a component party of Pakatan Harapan (PH) and formerly Pakatan Rakyat (PR) coalitions.

== Election results ==
Negeri Sembilan State Legislative Assembly
Year	Constituency	Candidate	Votes	Pct	Opponent(s)	Votes	Pct	Ballots cast	Majority	Turnout
2008	N12 Temiang	Ng Chin Tsai (DAP)	4,290	59.24%	Jason Lee Kee Chong (MCA)	2,952	40.76%	7,482	1,338	75.97%
2013	N12 Temiang	Ng Chin Tsai (DAP)	5,478	59.04%	Jason Lee Kee Chong (MCA)	3,801	40.96%	9,494	1,677	85.32%
2018	N12 Temiang	Ng Chin Tsai (DAP)	5,894	64.81%	Siow Koi Voon (MCA)	2,831	31.13%	9,234	3,063	82.56%
2018	N12 Temiang	Ng Chin Tsai (DAP)	5,894	64.81%	Yaw Con Seng (PAS)	369	4.06%	9,234	3,063	82.56%
2023	N12 Temiang	Ng Chin Tsai (DAP)	5,710	63.50%	Chang Er Chu (GERAKAN)	2,642	29.38%	9,061	3,068	69.31%
2023	N12 Temiang	Ng Chin Tsai (DAP)	5,710	63.50%	Ahmad Qusyairi Abdul Rahim (MUDA)	640	7.12%	9,061	3,068	69.31%
