= Gunasekaren Palasamy =

Malaysian politician

Yang Berhormat Dato' Gunasekaren Palasamy DBNS MLA

Member of the Negeri Sembilan State Legislative Assembly for Seremban Jaya
- In office 9 May 2018 – 1 August 2026
- Preceded by: Position established
- Succeeded by: Mugunthan Subramaniam (PH–DAP)
- Majority: 10,507 (2018); 12,703 (2023)

Member of the Negeri Sembilan State Legislative Assembly for Senawang
- In office 8 March 2008 – 9 May 2018
- Preceded by: Woo Ah Lek (BN–GERAKAN)
- Succeeded by: Position abolished
- Majority: 3,335 (2008); 4,805 (2013)

Personal details
- Born: Gunasekaran a/l Palasamy
- Party: Democratic Action Party (DAP)
- Other political affiliations: Pakatan Rakyat (PR) (2008–2015); Pakatan Harapan (PH) (since 2015)
- Occupation: Politician

Gunasekaren a/l Palasamy is a Malaysian politician who served as a Member of the Negeri Sembilan State Legislative Assembly (MLA) for Seremban Jaya from May 2018 to August 2026 and for Senawang from March 2008 to May 2018. He is a member of the Democratic Action Party (DAP), a component party of Pakatan Harapan (PH) and formerly Pakatan Rakyat (PR) coalitions. He is a longtime State Deputy Chairman of DAP of Negeri Sembilan.

== Election results ==
Negeri Sembilan State Legislative Assembly
| Year | Constituency | Candidate | Votes | Pct | Opponent(s) | Votes | Pct | Ballots cast | Majority | Turnout |
|---|---|---|---|---|---|---|---|---|---|---|
| 2008 | N24 Senawang | Gunasekaren Palasamy (DAP) | 6,512 | 67.21% | Woo Ah Lek (Gerakan) | 3,177 | 32.79% | 9,843 | 3,335 | 78.32% |
| 2013 | N24 Senawang | Gunasekaren Palasamy (DAP) | 9,010 | 67.57% | Choong Vee Hing (Gerakan) | 4,205 | 31.53% | 13,515 | 4,805 | 85.75% |
| 2013 | N24 Senawang | Gunasekaren Palasamy (DAP) | 9,010 | 67.57% | Karthigesan Shanmugam (IND) | 120 | 0.90% | 13,515 | 4,805 | 85.75% |
| 2018 | N24 Seremban Jaya | Gunasekaren Palasamy (DAP) | 13,760 | 80.41% | Choong Vee Hing (Gerakan) | 3,253 | 19.01% | 17,376 | 10,507 | 84.49% |
| 2018 | N24 Seremban Jaya | Gunasekaren Palasamy (DAP) | 13,760 | 80.41% | Sagaya Rajan Xavier (PAP) | 99 | 0.58% | 17,376 | 10,507 | 84.49% |
| 2023 | N24 Seremban Jaya | Gunasekaren Palasamy (DAP) | 17,080 | 79.60% | Lee Ban Fatt (Gerakan) | 4,377 | 20.40% | 21,664 | 12,703 | 67.09% |

== Honours ==
- Negeri Sembilan
  - Knight of the Order of Loyal Service to Negeri Sembilan (DBNS) – Dato' (2026)
