= Bagan Pinang (state constituency) =

Political subdivision in Negeri Sembilan, Malaysia

Bagan Pinang (N31)
Negeri Sembilan constituency

State constituency
- Legislature: Negeri Sembilan State Legislative Assembly
MLA
Abdul Fatah Zakaria
PN
- Constituency created: 2003
- First contested: 2004
- Last contested: 2026

Demographics
- Electors (2023): 27,790

N31 Bagan Pinang within Negeri Sembilan, as used for the 2023 and 2026 state elections

Bagan Pinang is a state constituency in Negeri Sembilan, Malaysia, that has been represented in the Negeri Sembilan State Legislative Assembly.

The state constituency was first contested in 2004 and is mandated to return a single Assemblyman to the Negeri Sembilan State Legislative Assembly under the first-past-the-post voting system.

== Demographics ==
Ethnic breakdown of Bagan Pinang's electorate as of 2026
1. Malay (75.6%)
2. Indian (9.70%)
3. Other ethnicities (7.70%)
4. Chinese (6.90%)

== History ==
=== Polling districts ===
According to the gazette issued on 23 July 2026, the Bagan Pinang constituency has a total of 8 polling districts.

State constituency	Polling districts	Code	Location
Bagan Pinang（N31）	Ladang Atherton	132/31/01	SJK (T) Ladang Atherton
Bagan Pinang（N31）	Pekan Siliau	132/31/02	SJK (T) Ldg Siliau
Bagan Pinang（N31）	Ladang Bradwall	132/31/03	SJK (T) Ldg Bradwall
Bagan Pinang（N31）	Sua Betong	132/31/04	SJK (T) Ldg Sua Betong
Bagan Pinang（N31）	Sunggala	132/31/05	SK Si-Rusa
Bagan Pinang（N31）	Kampung Bagan Pinang	132/31/06	SK Panglima Adnan
Bagan Pinang（N31）	Si Rusa	132/31/07	SK Kampung Baru Sirusa
Bagan Pinang（N31）	Telok Kemang	132/31/08	SK Telok Kemang; SK Intan Perdana

=== Representation history ===
Members of the Legislative Assembly for Bagan Pinang
Assembly	No	Years	Member	Party
Constituency created from Pasir Panjang and Si Rusa
11th	N31	2004-2008	Mohd Faizal Ramli	BN (UMNO)
12th	N31	2008	Azman Mohd Noor	BN (UMNO)
12th	N31	2008-2013	Mohd Isa Abdul Samad	BN (UMNO)
13th	N31	2013-2018	Tun Hairuddin Abu Bakar	BN (UMNO)
14th	N31	2018–2023	Tun Hairuddin Abu Bakar	BN (UMNO)
15th	N31	2023–2026	Abdul Fatah Zakaria	PN (PAS)
16th	N31	2026–present	Abdul Fatah Zakaria	PN (PAS)

== Election results ==
Negeri Sembilan state election, 2026
Party	Candidate	Votes	%	∆%
PN	Abdul Fatah Zakaria	14,603	74.49	▲15.19
PH	Nasir Raman	4,466	22.78	▲22.78
BERSATU	Sheikh Junaidy Jamaludin	536	2.73	▲2.73
Total valid votes		19,605	100.00	
Total rejected ballots		460		
Unreturned ballots		19		
Turnout		20,084	73.16	▼3.41
Registered electors		27,451		
Majority		10,137	51.71	▲33.11
PN hold		Swing		

Negeri Sembilan state election, 2023
Party	Candidate	Votes	%	∆%
PN	Abdul Fatah Zakaria	10,921	59.30	▲59.30
BN	Mohd Najib Mohd Isa	7,495	40.70	▼17.13
Total valid votes		18,416	100.00	
Total rejected ballots		2,585		
Unreturned ballots		30		
Turnout		21,031	75.68	▼5.02
Registered electors		27,790		
Majority		3,426	18.60	▲2.94
PN gain from BN		Swing		?

Negeri Sembilan state election, 2018
Party	Candidate	Votes	%	∆%
BN	Tun Hairuddin Abu Bakar	7,146	57.83	▼13.32
PKR	Rashid Latiff	5,211	42.17	▲42.17
Total valid votes		12,357	100.00	
Total rejected ballots		267		
Unreturned ballots		143		
Turnout		12,767	80.70	▼4.01
Registered electors		15,821		
Majority		1,935	15.66	▼26.64
BN hold		Swing		

Negeri Sembilan state election, 2013
Party	Candidate	Votes	%	∆%
BN	Tun Hairuddin Abu Bakar	10,206	71.15	▼4.51
PAS	Ramli Ismail	4,139	28.85	▲4.51
Total valid votes		14,345	100.00	
Total rejected ballots		375		
Unreturned ballots		0		
Turnout		14,720	84.71	▲2.96
Registered electors		17,377		
Majority		6,067	42.30	▼9.02
BN hold		Swing		
Source(s) "Federal Government Gazette - Notice of Contested Election, State Legislative Assembly for the State of Negeri Sembilan [P.U. (B) 193/2013]" (PDF). Attorney General's Chambers of Malaysia. 26 April 2013. "Federal Government Gazette - Results of Contested Election and Statements of the Poll after the Official Addition of Votes, State Constituencies for the State of Negeri Sembilan [P.U. (B) 234/2013]" (PDF). Attorney General's Chambers of Malaysia. 22 May 2013.

Negeri Sembilan state by-election, 11 October 2009 The by-election was called due to the death of incumbent, Azman Mohd Noor.
Party	Candidate	Votes	%	∆%
BN	Mohd Isa Abdul Samad	8,013	75.66	▲14.58
PAS	Zulkefly Mohamad Omar	2,578	24.34	▼14.58
Total valid votes		10,591	100.00	
Total rejected ballots		223		
Unreturned ballots		356		
Turnout		11,170	81.75	▲0.16
Registered electors		13,664		
Majority		5,435	51.32	▲29.16
BN hold		Swing		
Source(s) "Pilihan Raya Kecil N.31 Bagan Pinang". Election Commission of Malaysia.

Negeri Sembilan state election, 2008
Party	Candidate	Votes	%	∆%
BN	Azman Mohd Noor	6,430	61.08	▼18.23
PAS	Ramli Ismail	4,097	38.92	▲18.23
Total valid votes		10,527	100.00	
Total rejected ballots		384		
Unreturned ballots		668		
Turnout		11,579	81.59	▲10.00
Registered electors		14,192		
Majority		2,333	22.16	▼36.46
BN hold		Swing		

Negeri Sembilan state election, 2004
Party	Candidate	Votes	%
BN	Mohd Faizal Ramli	5,967	79.31
PAS	Hassan Alias	1,556	20.69
Total valid votes		7,523	100.00
Total rejected ballots		499	
Unreturned ballots		0	
Turnout		8,022	71.59
Registered electors		11,205	
Majority		4,411	58.62
This was a new constituency created.
