= 2026 Malaysian state elections =

Sub-national general elections

2026 Malaysian state election
- 18 July 2026 (Johor) & 1 August 2026 (Negeri Sembilan) & 14 November 2026 (Malacca) & 12 December 2026 (Sarawak)

4 out of 13 state legislatures (DUN) 192 out of 600 seats

State elections in 2026 were held in Johor, Negeri Sembilan, Malacca and Sarawak as the legislatures were dissolve earlier.

== Composition ==
Total seats
State	Total seats	PH	±	BN	±	PN	±	Others (Note: Including independents and other minor political parties.)	±	Vacant seats	±
Previous election results (according to each respective state)
Johor	56	12		40		3		1		None	
Negeri Sembilan	36	17		14		5		0		None	
Malacca	28	5		21		2		0		None	
Sarawak	82	2		0		0		80		None	
Total	202	36		75		10		81		None	
Following the dissolution of the State Legislative Assemblies
Johor	56	13	Steady	40	Steady	3	Steady	0	▼1	0	Steady
Negeri Sembilan	36	17	Steady	14	Steady	5	Steady	0	Steady	0	Steady
Malacca	28	5	Steady	20	Steady	3	Steady	0	Steady	0	Steady
Sarawak	82	2	Steady	0	Steady	0	Steady	80	Steady	0	Steady
Total	202	37	Steady	74	Steady	11	Steady	80	▼1	0	Steady
Election results
Johor	56	8	5	48	8	0	3	0	1	0	Steady
Negeri Sembilan	36	11	▼6	18	▲4	7	▲2	0	Steady	0	Steady
Malacca	28	4	▼1	21	▲1	3	Steady	0	Steady	0	Steady
Sarawak	82	Pending									
Total	120	23	▼12	87	▲13	10	▲2	0	1	0	Steady

== Important Dates ==
State Legislature	Term Began	Term End	Dissolution Date	Nomination Day	Early Voting Days	Election Day	Refs
Johor	21 April 2022	21 April 2027	1 June 2026	27 June 2026	7–10 July 2026	11 July 2026	
Negeri Sembilan	26 September 2023	26 September 2027	5 June 2026	18 July 2026	28–31 July 2026	1 August 2026	
Malacca	27 December 2021	27 December 2026	23 September 2026	31 October 2026	10–13 November 2026	14 November 2026	
Sarawak	14 February 2022	14 February 2027	26 October 2026	28 November 2026	8–11 December 2026	12 December 2026	

== Opinion polls ==
=== Johor ===
Pollster	Fieldwork date	Sample size	BN	PH	PN	Others	Lead	Ref
Ilham Centre	26 June − 9 July 2026	1,250						
Vodus Research	15−29 June 2026	1,303	36%	26%	15%	13%	BN +10%	

=== Negeri Sembilan ===
Pollster	Fieldwork date	Sample size	PH	BN	PN	Others	Lead	Ref
Ilham Centre	18–30 July 2026	1002						
Vodus Research	9–21 July 2026	437	42%	35%	7%	2%	PH +7%	

=== Malacca ===
Pollster	Fieldwork date	Sample size	BN	PH	PN	Others	Lead	Ref
Ilham Centre	1 − 12 November 2026	805						
