= Negeri Sembilan State Executive Council =

Executive branch of the Negeri Sembilan state government

- Date formed: 2 August 2026

People and organisations
- Head of state: Muhriz
- Head of government: Ismail Lasim (BN–UMNO)
- Total no. of members: 11
- Member parties: Barisan Nasional (BN) and Perikatan Nasional (PN) coalition government: Barisan Nasional (BN); United Malays National Organisation (UMNO); Malaysian Chinese Association (MCA); Perikatan Nasional (PN); Malaysian Islamic Party (PAS); National Vision Party (WAWASAN)
- Status in legislature: Coalition government 25 / 36
- Opposition parties: Pakatan Harapan (PH); People's Justice Party (PKR); Democratic Action Party (DAP)
- Opposition leader: Arul Kumar Jambunathan (PH–DAP)

History
- Legislature term: 15th Malaysian Parliament

The Negeri Sembilan State Executive Council is the executive authority of the Government of Negeri Sembilan, Malaysia. The Council comprises the Menteri Besar, appointed by the Yang di-Pertuan Besar on the basis that he is able to command a majority in the Negeri Sembilan State Legislative Assembly, a number of members made up of members of the Assembly, the State Secretary, the State Legal Adviser and the State Financial Officer.

This council is similar in structure and role to the Cabinet of Malaysia, while being smaller in size. As federal and state responsibilities differ, there are a number of portfolios that differ between the federal and state governments.

Members of the council are selected by the Menteri Besar, appointed by the Yang di-Pertuan Besar. The council has no ministry, but instead a number of committees; each committee will take care of certain state affairs, activities and departments. Members of the council are always the chair of a committee.

== Lists of full members ==
Currently, Tuanku Muhriz has revoked all the exco membership due to breach of oath.

BN (1)
- UMNO (1)

Members from 7 August 2026 to 20 September 2026:

Name	Portfolio	Party	Constituency	Term start	Term end
Dato' Ismail Lasim (Menteri Besar)	Islamic Affairs; Investment; Security; Finance; Land and Natural Resources; Infrastructure and Public Facilities; FELDA	BN (UMNO)	Juasseh	2 August 2026	Incumbent
Suhaimizan Bizar	Health; National Unity; Information; National Unity and Integration; Non-Government Organization (NGO)	BN (UMNO)	Gemencheh	7 August 2026	21 September 2026
Dato' Mustapha Nagoor	Youth and Sports	BN (UMNO)	Palong	7 August 2026	21 September 2026
Dato' Mohd Razi Mohd Ali	Agriculture, Food Security and Cost Living	BN (UMNO)	Sungai Lui	7 August 2026	21 September 2026
Dato' Zaifulbahri Idris	Education; Human Capital	BN (UMNO)	Chembong	7 August 2026	21 September 2026
Datuk Mohd Asna Amin	Industry; Science, Technology and Innovation; Digital	BN (UMNO)	Lenggeng	7 August 2026	21 September 2026
Dato' Mohd Faizal Ramli	Rural Development	BN (UMNO)	Linggi	7 August 2026	21 September 2026
Siti Nur Umirah Hashim	Women's affairs; Social welfare	BN (UMNO)	Labu	7 August 2026	21 September 2026
Siow Kong Choon	Housing and Local Government; Non-Muslim Affairs	BN (MCA)	Chennah	7 August 2026	21 September 2026
Mohd Fairuz Mohd Isa	Consumer Affairs; Human Resources; Climate Change; Cooperatives and Consumerism	PN (PAS)	Serting	7 August 2026	21 September 2026
Datuk Razali Abu Samah	Tourism; Arts and Culture	PN (WAWASAN)	Sikamat	7 August 2026	21 September 2026

=== Ex officio members ===
Position	Name
State Secretary	Mohd Zafir Ibrahim
State Financial Officer	Johani Hassan
State Legal Advisor	Iskandar Ali Dewa

== Former membership ==
=== Ismail Lasim EXCO (2026) ===
Tuanku Muhriz has revoked all the exco membership due to breach of oath.

BN (1)
- UMNO (1)

Members from 7 August 2026 to 20 September 2026:

Name	Portfolio	Party	Constituency	Term start	Term end
Dato' Ismail Lasim (Menteri Besar)	Islamic Affairs; Investment; Security; Finance; Land and Natural Resources; Infrastructure and Public Facilities; FELDA	BN (UMNO)	Juasseh	2 August 2026	16 November 2026
Suhaimizan Bizar	Health; National Unity; Information; National Unity and Integration; Non-Government Organization (NGO)	BN (UMNO)	Gemencheh	7 August 2026	21 September 2026
Dato' Mustapha Nagoor	Youth and Sports	BN (UMNO)	Palong	7 August 2026	21 September 2026
Dato' Mohd Razi Mohd Ali	Agriculture, Food Security and Cost Living	BN (UMNO)	Sungai Lui	7 August 2026	21 September 2026
Dato' Zaifulbahri Idris	Education; Human Capital	BN (UMNO)	Chembong	7 August 2026	21 September 2026
Datuk Mohd Asna Amin	Industry; Science, Technology and Innovation; Digital	BN (UMNO)	Lenggeng	7 August 2026	21 September 2026
Dato' Mohd Faizal Ramli	Rural Development	BN (UMNO)	Linggi	7 August 2026	21 September 2026
Siti Nur Umirah Hashim	Women's affairs; Social welfare	BN (UMNO)	Labu	7 August 2026	21 September 2026
Siow Kong Choon	Housing and Local Government; Non-Muslim Affairs	BN (MCA)	Chennah	7 August 2026	21 September 2026
Mohd Fairuz Mohd Isa	Consumer Affairs; Human Resources; Climate Change; Cooperatives and Consumerism	PN (PAS)	Serting	7 August 2026	21 September 2026
Datuk Razali Abu Samah	Tourism; Arts and Culture	PN (WAWASAN)	Sikamat	7 August 2026	21 September 2026

=== Aminuddin II EXCO (2023–2026) ===
PH (7)	Vacant (4)
DAP (4); PKR (3)	Vacant (4)

Members from 14 August 2023 to 2 August 2026 were :

Name	Portfolio	Party	Constituency	Term start	Term end
Dato' Seri Utama Aminuddin Harun (Menteri Besar)	Islamic Affairs; Investment; Security; Finance; Land and Natural Resources; Infrastructure and Public Facilities	PH (PKR)	Sikamat	14 August 2023	2 August 2026
Datuk Seri Jalaluddin Alias (Senior Member)	Rural Development; Plantation and Commodities; Agriculture, Food Security and Cost Living	BN (UMNO)	Pertang	24 August 2023	27 April 2026
Teo Kok Seong	Industry; Non-Muslim Affairs	PH (DAP)	Bahau	24 August 2023	2 August 2026
Nicole Tan Lee Koon	Tourism; Arts and Culture	PH (DAP)	Bukit Kepayang	24 August 2023	2 August 2026
Veerapan Superamaniam	Consumer Affairs; Human Resources; Climate Change; Cooperatives and Consumerism	PH (DAP)	Repah	24 August 2023	2 August 2026
Arul Kumar Jambunathan	Housing and Local Government; Public Transport	PH (DAP)	Nilai	24 August 2023	2 August 2026
Dato' Ismail Lasim	Education; Human Capital	BN (UMNO)	Senaling	24 August 2023	27 April 2026
Dato' Haji Mustapha Nagoor	Youth and Sports	BN (UMNO)	Palong	24 August 2023	27 April 2026
Datuk Mohd Faizal Ramli	Heritage; Science, Technology and Innovation; Digital	BN (UMNO)	Linggi	24 August 2023	27 April 2026
Dato' Noorzunita Begum Mohd Ibrahim	Women's affairs; Social welfare	PH (PKR)	Pilah	24 August 2023	2 August 2026
Dato' Tengku Zamrah Tengku Sulaiman	Health; National Unity; Information; National Unity and Integration; Non-Government Organization (NGO)	PH (PKR)	Ampangan	24 August 2023	2 August 2026

=== Aminuddin I EXCO (2018–2023) ===
PH (11)
- DAP (5)
- PKR (4)
- AMANAH (2)

Members from 12 May 2018 to 14 August 2023 were :

Name	Portfolio	Party	Constituency	Term start	Term end
Dato' Seri Aminuddin Harun (Menteri Besar)	Finance; Land and Natural Resources; Islamic Affairs; Tourism; Security; Infrastructure and Public Facilities	PKR	Sikamat	12 May 2018	14 August 2023
Teo Kok Seong	Urban Wellbeing; Housing and Local Government; New Villages	DAP	Bahau	23 May 2018	14 August 2023
Dr. Mohamad Rafie Abdul Malek	Investment; Industry; Entrepreneurship; Education; Human Capital	PKR	Ampangan	23 May 2018	14 August 2023
Ismail Ahmad	Rural Development	PKR	Labu	23 May 2018	14 August 2023
Arul Kumar Jambunathan	Human Resources; Plantation; Non-Muslim Affairs	DAP	Nilai	23 May 2018	26 January 2023
Chew Seh Yong	Human Resources; Plantation; Non-Muslim Affairs	DAP	Lobak	10 February 2023	14 August 2023
Mohamad Taufek Abd. Ghani	Youth and Sports	AMANAH	Paroi	23 May 2018	14 August 2023
Dato' Bakri Sawir	Agriculture and Agro-based Industry	AMANAH	Kelawang	23 May 2018	14 August 2023
Mohamad Nazaruddin Sabtu	Culture and Art; Malay Customs	PKR	Pilah	23 May 2018	14 August 2023
Veerapan Superamaniam	Health; Environment; Cooperatives and Consumerism	DAP	Repah	23 May 2018	14 August 2023
Nicole Tan Lee Koon	Women's affairs; Social welfare	DAP	Bukit Kepayang	23 May 2018	14 August 2023
Choo Ken Hwa	Information; National Unity and Integration	DAP	Lukut	23 May 2018	14 August 2023

=== Mohamad Hasan III EXCO (2013–2018) ===
BN (11)
- UMNO (10)
- MIC (1)

Members from 2013 to 2018 were :

Name	Portfolio	Party	Constituency	Term start	Term end
Mohamad Hasan (Menteri Besar)		UMNO	Rantau	2013	2018
Ismail Lasim	Unity; National Integration	UMNO	Senaling	22 May 2013	12 May 2018
Hasim Rusdi	Agriculture; Agro-based Industry	UMNO	Labu	22 May 2013	12 May 2018
Shamshulkahar Mohd Deli	Education; Health	UMNO	Serting	22 May 2013	12 May 2018
Norhayati Omar	Women; Family Development Welfare	UMNO	Pilah	22 May 2013	12 May 2018
Jalaluddin Alias	Urban Wellbeing; Housing; Local Government	UMNO	Pertang	22 May 2013	12 May 2018
Zaifulbahri Idris	Human Capital Development; Youth and Sports	UMNO	Chembong	22 May 2013	12 May 2018
Abu Ubaidah Redza	Public Utilities; Environment; Cooperatives; Consumerism	UMNO	Ampangan	22 May 2013	12 May 2018
Tun Hairuddin Abu Bakar	Tourism	UMNO	Bagan Pinang	22 May 2013	12 May 2018
Abd Razak Ab Said	Culture; Malay Customs	UMNO	Gemas	22 May 2013	12 May 2018
Manickam Letchuman	Human Resources; Plantations; New Villages	MIC	Jeram Padang	22 May 2013	12 May 2018

=== Mohamad Hasan II EXCO (2008–2013) ===
BN (11)
- UMNO (9)
- MCA (1)
- MIC (1)

Members from 2008 to 2013 were :

Name	Portfolio	Party	Constituency	Term start	Term end
Mohamad Hasan (Menteri Besar)		UMNO	Rantau	2008	2013
Ismail Lasim	Infrastructure; Water; Energy; Telecommunications	UMNO	Senaling	14 March 2008	21 May 2013
Hasim Rusdi	Rural Development; Consumer Affairs; Public Facilities	UMNO	Labu	14 March 2008	21 May 2013
Shamshulkahar Mohd Deli	Education; Higher Learning Institutions	UMNO	Serting	14 March 2008	21 May 2013
Yunus Rahmat		UMNO	Kelawang	14 March 2008	21 May 2013
Abdul Samad Ibrahim	Human Capital Development; Youth and Sports	UMNO	Seri Menanti	14 March 2008	21 May 2013
Mohammad Razi Kail		UMNO	Juasseh	14 March 2008	21 May 2013
Ismail Taib		UMNO	Linggi	14 March 2008	21 May 2013
Zainab Nasir		UMNO	Gemas	14 March 2008	21 May 2013
Mogan Velayatham	Human Resources; Plantations	MIC	Jeram Padang	14 March 2008	21 May 2013
Siow Chen Pin	New Villages	MCA	Chennah	14 March 2008	21 May 2013

=== Mohamad Hasan I EXCO (2004–2008) ===
BN (11)
- UMNO (7)
- MCA (2)
- MIC (1)
- Gerakan (1)

Members from 2004 to 2008 were :

Name	Portfolio	Party	Constituency	Term start	Term end
Mohamad Hasan (Menteri Besar)		UMNO	Rantau	2004	2008
Ismail Lasim	Public Works; Communication; Telecommunications; Post	UMNO	Senaling	29 March 2004	13 March 2008
Norhayati Omar	Social; Community Development; Women's Affairs	UMNO	Pilah	29 March 2004	13 March 2008
Zakaria Nordin		UMNO	Ampangan	2004	2008
Muhammad Rais Zainuddin		UMNO	Chembong	2004	2008
Jamlus Aziz		UMNO	Gemas	2004	2008
Razak Mansor		UMNO	Pertang	2004	2008
Peter Lai Yit Fee		MCA	Nilai	2004	2008
Yu Chok Tow		MCA	Mambau	2004	2008
Rajagopalu Thamotharapillay		MIC	Jeram Padang	2004	2008
Woo Ah Lek		Gerakan	Senawang	2004	2008

=== Mohd Isa V EXCO (1999–2004) ===
BN (11)
- UMNO (7)
- MCA (2)
- MIC (1)
- Gerakan (1)

Members from 1999 to 2004 were :

Name	Portfolio	Party	Constituency	Term start	Term end
Mohd Isa Abdul Samad (Menteri Besar)		UMNO	Linggi	1999	2004
Norhayati Omar		UMNO	Pilah	1999	2004
Zakaria Nordin		UMNO	Ampangan	1999	2004
Lilah Yasin		UMNO	Serting	1999	2004
Darus Salim Bulin		UMNO	Johol	1999	2004
Shamsul Bahari Mat		UMNO	Kelawang	1999	2004
Yeow Chai Thiam		MCA	Lukut	1999	2004
Peter Lai Yit Fee		MCA	Nilai	1999	2004
Rajagopalu Thamotharapillay		MIC	Jeram Padang	1999	2004
Yohevel Esekimuthu		MIC	Si Rusa	1999	2004
Woo Ah Lek		Gerakan	Senawang	1999	2004

=== Mohd Isa IIII EXCO (1995–1999) ===
BN (9)
- UMNO (5)
- MCA (2)
- MIC (1)
- Gerakan (1)

Members from 1995 to 1999 were :

Name	Portfolio	Party	Constituency	Term start	Term end
Mohd Isa Abdul Samad (Menteri Besar)		UMNO	Linggi	1995	1999
Waad Mansor		UMNO	Gemencheh	1995	1999
Lilah Yasin		UMNO	Serting	1995	1999
Shamsul Bahari Mat		UMNO	Kelawang	1995	1999
Napsiah Omar		UMNO	Pilah	1995	1999
Yeow Chai Thiam		MCA	Lukut	1995	1999
		MCA		1995	1999
		MIC		1995	1999
		Gerakan		1995	1999

== See also ==
- Yang di-Pertuan Besar of Negeri Sembilan
- Menteri Besar of Negeri Sembilan
- Negeri Sembilan State Legislative Assembly
