= Manickam Letchuman =

Malaysian politician (born 1959)

Yang Berbahagia Dato' Manickam Letchuman DPNS PMC PJK
- மாணிக்கம் லெட்சுமான்

Member of the Negeri Sembilan State Executive Council
- In office 22 May 2013 – 12 May 2018 (Human Resources, Plantations and New Villages)
- Monarch: Muhriz
- Menteri Besar: Mohamad Hasan
- Preceded by: Mogan Velayatham (Human Resources and Plantations); Siow Chen Pin (New Villages)
- Succeeded by: Arul Kumar Jambunathan (Human Resources and Plantations); Teo Kok Seong (New Villages)
- Constituency: Jeram Padang

Member of the Negeri Sembilan State Legislative Assembly for Jeram Padang
- In office 5 May 2013 – 12 August 2023
- Preceded by: Mogan Velayatham (BN–MIC)
- Succeeded by: Mohd Zaidy Abdul Kadir (BN–UMNO)
- Majority: 2,691 (2013); 1,062 (2018)

Faction represented in Negeri Sembilan State Legislative Assembly
- 2013–2023: Barisan Nasional

Personal details
- Born: Manickam a/l Letchuman; 30 November 1959 (age 66) Negeri Sembilan, Malaysia
- Citizenship: Malaysian
- Party: Malaysian Indian Congress (MIC) (1978–2023); Independent (2023–2024); Malaysian Islamic Party (PAS) (since 2024)
- Other political affiliations: Barisan Nasional (BN) (1978–2023); Perikatan Nasional (PN) (since 2024)
- Occupation: Politician

Yang Berbahagia Dato' Manickam s/o Letchuman (born 30 November 1959) is a Malaysian politician who served as Member of the Negeri Sembilan State Executive Council (EXCO) in the Barisan Nasional (BN) state administration under former Menteri Besar Mohamad Hasan from May 2013 to the collapse of the BN administration in May 2018 as well as Member of the Negeri Sembilan State Legislative Assembly (MLA) for Jeram Padang from May 2013 to August 2023. He is a member of the Supporter Congress of the Malaysian Islamic Party (PAS), a component party of the Perikatan Nasional (PN) coalition. He was an independent and a member and State Chairman of Negeri Sembilan and Division Chief of Jempol of the Malaysian Indian Congress (MIC), a component party of the BN coalition.

On 6 October 2023, Manickam left MIC. In 2024, he joined PAS as a member of its Supporter Congress (DHPP).

== Political career ==
=== Member of the Negeri Sembilan State Executive Council (2013–2018) ===
In the 2013 Negeri Sembilan state election, the ruling BN gained victory, won the majority in the assembly and was reelected to power. Rantau MLA Mohamad of BN was reappointed the Menteri Besar. On 22 May 2013, Manickam was appointed as the Negeri Sembilan State EXCO Member in charge of Human Resources, Plantations and New Villages by Mohamad.

In the 2018 Negeri Sembilan state election, BN suffered from defeat, lost the majority in the assembly and power to Pakatan Harapan (PH). State Chairman of PH of Negeri Sembilan and Sikamat MLA Aminuddin Harun replaced Mohamad as the new Menteri Besar and formed the new PH state administration on 12 May 2018. Therefore, Manickam lost his EXCO Member position.

=== Member of the Negeri Sembilan State Legislative Assembly (2013–2023) ===
==== 2013 Negeri Sembilan state election ====
In the 2013 state election, Manickam made his electoral debut after being nominated by BN to contest for the Jeram Padang state seat. He won the seat and was elected to the Negeri Sembilan State Legislative Assembly as the Jeram Padang MLA for the first term after defeating Kumar A/L Thuraisingham of Pakatan Rakyat (PR) and independent candidates Zailani Zakaria as well as Mazavan A Raman Nair by the majority of 2,691 votes.

==== 2018 Negeri Sembilan state election ====
In the 2018 state election, Manickam was renominated by BN to defend the Jeram Padang seat. He defended the seat and was reelected to the Negeri Sembilan State Legislative Assembly as the Jeram Padang MLA for the second term after defeating independent candidate Surash Sreenivasan, S Musliadi Sabtu of PH and Mohd Fairuz Mohd Isa of Gagasan Sejahtera (GS).

==== 2023 Negeri Sembilan state election ====
In the 2023 Negeri Sembilan state election, MIC decided against contesting in it. Manickam did not defend the Jeram Padang seat following the decision. Mohd Zaidy Abdul Kadir of another BN component party the United Malays National Organisation (UMNO) was nominated by BN to contest for the seat instead. Mohd Zaidy later won the seat and replaced Manickam as the new Jeram Padang MLA.

== Election results ==
Negeri Sembilan State Legislative Assembly
Year	Constituency	Candidate	Votes	Pct	Opponent(s)	Votes	Pct	Ballots cast	Majority	Turnout
2013	N07 Jeram Padang	Manickam Letchuman (MIC)	5,690	63.68%	Kumar Thuraisingham (PKR)	2,999	33.57%	9,185	2,691	81.20%
2013	N07 Jeram Padang	Manickam Letchuman (MIC)	5,690	63.68%	Zailani Zakaria (IND)	201	2.25%	9,185	2,691	81.20%
2013	N07 Jeram Padang	Manickam Letchuman (MIC)	5,690	63.68%	Mazavan Raman Nair (IND)	45	0.50%	9,185	2,691	81.20%
2018	N07 Jeram Padang	Manickam Letchuman (MIC)	3,702	39.26%	Surash Sreenivasan (IND)	2,640	28.00%	9,844	1,062	79.80%
2018	N07 Jeram Padang	Manickam Letchuman (MIC)	3,702	39.26%	S Musliadi Sabtu (PKR)	2,302	24.41%	9,844	1,062	79.80%
2018	N07 Jeram Padang	Manickam Letchuman (MIC)	3,702	39.26%	Mohd Fairuz Mohd Isa (PAS)	785	8.33%	9,844	1,062	79.80%

== Honours ==
- Negeri Sembilan
  - Knight Commander of the Order of Loyalty to Negeri Sembilan (DPNS) – Dato' (2015)
  - Recipient of the Medal for Outstanding Public Service (PMC) (2011)
  - Recipient of the Meritorious Service Medal (PJK) (2006)
