= 2000 Telok Kemang by-election =

- 10 June 2000

Seat of Telok Kemang in Dewan Rakyat
- Registered: 66,646
- Turnout: 68.18%
	BN	KeADILan
Candidate	S. Sothinathan	Ruslan Kasim
Party	Barisan Nasional (MIC)	KeADILan
Alliance		BA
Popular vote	24,500	18,528
Percentage	56.94%	43.06%
Swing	▼4.09%	▲43.06%
MP before election
S. A. Anpalagan
Barisan Nasional
Elected MP
S. Sothinathan
Barisan Nasional

The 2000 Telok Kemang by-election was a by-election that was held on 10 June 2000 for the Dewan Rakyat seat of Telok Kemang, Negeri Sembilan. It was called following the death of its Member of Parliament, S. A. Anpalagan on 28th April 2000. Anpalagan won the seat on 1999 Malaysian general election with a 9,942 majority.

S. Sothinathan of Barisan Nasional won the seat against KeADILan candidate Ruslan Kasim with a majority of 5,972 votes.The seat have 66,646 registered voters.

== Nomination ==
Nomination day is on 30th May 2000. Barisan Nasional nominated MIC president political secretary, S. Sothinathan. KeADILan nominated its information chief and Negeri Sembilan chairman, Ruslan Kasim.

== Results ==
Malaysian general by-election, 10 June 2000: Telok Kemang Upon the death of incumbent, S. A. Anpalagan
Party	Candidate	Votes	%	∆%
BN	Sothinathan Sinna Goundar	24,500	56.94	▼4.09
PKR	Ruslan Kasim	18,528	43.06	▲43.06
Total valid votes		43,028	100.00	
Total rejected ballots		1,051		
Unreturned ballots		0		
Turnout		44,079	66.14	▼6.14
Registered electors		66,646		
Majority		5,972	13.88	▼8.18
BN hold		Swing		
