= Redza =

Redza is a Malaysian name. Notable people with the name include:

- Redza Piyadasa (1939–2007), Malaysian artist
- Abu Ubaidah Redza, Malaysian politician
