= 2011 FLB Playoffs =

The 2011 FLB Playoffs is the final phase of the 2010–11 Lebanese Basketball League. It started on April 17, 2011 and ended on May 8, 2011.

== Bracket ==
Semifinals
1	Riyadi	3
4	Sagesse	0
2	Champville	3
5	Mouttahed	1

Finals
1	Riyadi	3
2	Champville	0

== Semifinals ==
The semifinals are best-of-5 series.

=== Riyadi vs. Sagesse ===
April 17
17:00

Report

Riyadi	82–73	Sagesse
Scoring by quarter: 29–17, 16–16, 13–20, 24–20
Pts: Johnson 26; Rebs: Ahmad 13; Asts: El Turk 7		Pts: Watkins 26; Rebs: Watkins 17; Asts: Fahed 6
1–0

Saeb Salam Arena, Beirut

April 20
20:45

Report

Sagesse	57–72	Riyadi
Scoring by quarter: 15–22, 14–18, 13–16, 15–16
Pts: Thompson 17; Rebs: Watkins 11; Asts: Watkins, Rida 4		Pts: Ahmad 30; Rebs: Ahmad 10; Asts: Johnson 5
2–0

Ghazir Club Court, Beirut

April 23
15:00

Report

Riyadi	85–69	Sagesse
Scoring by quarter: 22–15, 21–10, 27–18, 15–26
Pts: Johnson 24; Rebs: Ahmad, Johnson 10; Asts: Mahmoud 8		Pts: Watkins 24; Rebs: Watkins 7 Asts: Khoury 4
Riyadi wins series 3–0

Saeb Salam Arena, Beirut

=== Champville vs. Mouttahed ===
April 19
20:45

Report

Champville	90–65	Mouttahed
Scoring by quarter: 28–16, 13–10, 23–21, 26–18
Pts: El Khatib 31; Rebs: Benson 23; Asts: Anderson 7		Pts: Johnson 20; Rebs: Brand 6 Asts: Johnson 5
1–0

Champville Stadium, Dik El Mehdi

April 20
20:45

Report

Mouttahed	83–72	Champville
Scoring by quarter: 26–15, 22–17, 16–18, 19–22
Pts: Johnson 33; Rebs: Johnson, Bawji 11; Asts: Three Players 3		Pts: El Khatib 22; Rebs: Benson 22; Asts: Anderson 4
1–1

Safadi Sport Center, Tripoli

April 26
20:45

Report

Champville	93–79	Mouttahed
Scoring by quarter: 27–23, 22–17, 19–15, 25–24
Pts: El Khatib 36; Rebs: Benson 26; Asts: Three Players 2		Pts: Johnson 33; Rebs: Brand 12; Asts: Johnson 4
2–1

Champville Stadium, Dik El Mehdi

April 30
15:00

Report

Mouttahed	66–75	Champville
Scoring by quarter: 16–22, 21–15, 20–14, 9–24
Pts: Brand 18; Rebs: Brand 10; Asts: Three Players 3		Pts: Benson 28; Rebs: Benson 33; Asts: El Khatib 5
Champville wins series 3–1

Safadi Sport Center, Tripoli

== Finals ==
The finals are best-of-5 series.

=== Riyadi vs Champville ===
May 4
20:00

Report

Riyadi	92–77	Champville
Scoring by quarter: 26–20, 27–23, 19–9, 20–25
Pts: Ahmad 26; Rebs: Ahmad, Vogel 8 Asts: Mahmoud 6		Pts: El Khatib 33; Rebs: Benson 12; Asts: Anderson 8
1–0

Saeb Salam Arena, Beirut

May 7
15:00

Report

Champville	104–107 (OT)	Riyadi
Scoring by quarter: 10–20, 29–18, 26–23, 17–21, Overtime: 14–14, 8–11
Pts: El Khatib 36; Rebs: Benson 15; Asts: El Khatib 7		Pts: Johnson 41; Rebs: Ahmad 18; Asts: Ahmad 11
0–2

Champville Stadium, Dik El Mehdi

May 8
17:00

Report

Riyadi	76–66	Champville
Scoring by quarter: 9–19, 21–20, 26–16, 20–11
Pts: Johnson 24; Rebs: Johnson 11; Asts: Johnson 7		Pts: El Khatib 26; Rebs: Benson 11; Asts: Mazen Mneimneh 4
Riyadi wins series 3–0

Saeb Salam Arena, Beirut

2011 FLB League

Riyadi
22nd Title
