= Mogan Velayatham =

Malaysian politician

Yang Berbahagia Dato' Mogan Velayatham DPNS PJK AMN

Special Advisor to the Menteri Besar of Negeri Sembilan
- Incumbent
- Assumed office 1 September 2026

Member of the Negeri Sembilan State Executive Council
- In office 14 March 2008 – 21 May 2013
- Monarchs: Ja'afar; Muhriz
- Menteri Besar: Mohamad Hasan
- Portfolio: Human Resources, Plantations, Public Utilities, Environment, Cooperatives and Consumerism
- Succeeded by: Manickam Letchuman (Human Resources and Plantations); Abu Ubaidah Redza (Public Utilities, Environment, Cooperatives and Consumerism)
- Constituency: Jeram Padang

Member of the Negeri Sembilan State Legislative Assembly for Jeram Padang
- In office 8 March 2008 – 5 May 2013
- Preceded by: Krishnan Letchumanan (BN–MIC)
- Succeeded by: Manickam Letchuman (BN–MIC)
- Majority: 1,808 (2008)

Personal details
- Party: Malaysian Indian Congress (MIC)
- Other political affiliations: Barisan Nasional (BN)

Mogan a/l Velayatham is a Malaysian politician who served as Member of the Negeri Sembilan State Executive Council (EXCO) in the Barisan Nasional (BN) state administration under former Menteri Besar Mohamad Hasan from March 2008 to May 2013 as well as Member of the Negeri Sembilan State Legislative Assembly (MLA) for Jeram Padang from March 2008 to May 2013. He is a member of Malaysian Indian Congress (MIC), a component party of Barisan Nasional (BN) coalitions.

== Election results ==
Negeri Sembilan State Legislative Assembly
Year	Constituency	Candidate	Votes	Pct	Opponent(s)	Votes	Pct	Ballots cast	Majority	Turnout
2008	N07 Jeram Padang	Mogan Velayatham (MIC)	4,185	63.78%	Manoharan Kannan (PKR)	2,377	36.22%	6,845	1,808	68.72%

Parliament of Malaysia
Year	Constituency	Candidate	Votes	Pct	Opponent(s)	Votes	Pct	Ballot casts	Majority	Turnout
2013	P132 Telok Kemang	Mogan Velayatham (MIC)	28,269	48.31%	Kamarul Baharin Abbas (PKR)	29,848	51.01%	59,984	1,579	85.05%
2013	P132 Telok Kemang	Mogan Velayatham (MIC)	28,269	48.31%	Kamarudin Kumaravel Abdullah (IND)	394	0.67%	59,984	1,579	85.05%
2018	P132 Port Dickson	Mogan Velayatham (MIC)	18,515	30.19%	Danyal Balagopal Abdullah (PKR)	36,225	59.06%	62,548	17,710	83.16%
2018	P132 Port Dickson	Mogan Velayatham (MIC)	18,515	30.19%	Mahfuz Roslan (PAS)	6,594	10.75%	62,548	17,710	83.16%

== Honours ==
- Malaysia
  - Member of the Order of the Defender of the Realm (AMN) (2003)
- Negeri Sembilan
  - Knight Commander of the Order of Loyalty to Negeri Sembilan (DPNS) – Dato' (2010)
  - Recipient of the Meritorious Service Medal (PJK) (2000)
