= Tun Faisal Ismail Aziz =

Malaysian politician

Yang Berbahagia Datuk Tun Faisal Ismail Aziz PMW
- تون فيصل اسماعيل عزيز
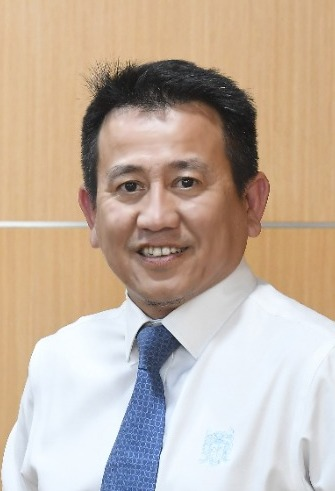
- Tun Faisal Ismail in 2020

5th Information Chief of the Malaysian United Indigenous Party
- Incumbent
- Assumed office 29 November 2024
- President: Muhyiddin Yassin
- Preceded by: Razali Idris

Personal details
- Born: Tun Faisal Ismail bin Aziz; 9 October 1971 (age 54) Ipoh, Perak, Malaysia
- Party: UMNO (until 2023); BERSATU (2023–present)
- Spouse: Norhafilah Mohammad Khawari
- Children: 4
- Parents: Aziz Pandak (father); Puteri Faizah Megat Alias (mother)
- Education: Tuanku Abdul Rahman School
- Alma mater: Universiti Sains Malaysia (BSc)

Tun Faisal Ismail bin Aziz (Jawi: تون فيصل اسماعيل بن عزيز; born 9 October 1971) is a Malaysian politician who served as the information chief of the Malaysian United Indigenous Party (BERSATU) since November 2024. Tun Faisal Ismail is the former Press Secretary to the former Minister of Federal Territories and Minister of Communications and Multimedia Annuar Musa. He previously served as Director of the Strategic Communications Division of the Special Affairs Department (JASA) of the Ministry of Communications and Multimedia (MCMC) from February 2014 until May 2018.

== Early life and education ==
Tun Faisal Ismail bin Aziz was born on 9 October 1971 in Ipoh, Perak. Tun Faisal Ismail is the first child of three siblings. His father, Aziz Pandak, a teacher from Lambor Kiri, Perak. While his mother, Puteri Faizah Megat Alias, is a religious teacher from Kuala Kangsar, Perak. He also comes from the Megat Terawis bloodline. He grew up in Teluk Intan when he was four to six years old, before moving to Tanjung Rambutan and then to Rapat Setia, Ipoh.

Tun Faisal Ismail underwent his primary education at Sri Kinta Primary School, Ipoh and secondary education at Perak National Religious School (SMKAP), Gunung Rapat (later known as Sultan Azlan Shah National Religious School (SMKASAS), Bandar Sri Iskandar) and Islamic College, Klang (KIK) which was later known as Sultan Alam Shah Islamic College (KISAS). He then went on to study for Universiti Sains Malaysia Matriculation at Tuanku Abdul Rahman School (STAR), Ipoh before continuing his studies in the field of Pharmaceutical Sciences at Universiti Sains Malaysia, Penang. He obtained his Bachelor of Science in pharmacy with Honors in 1996.

== Political career ==
He began his political career as an active member of the United Malays National Organisation (UMNO), the most dominant political party in Malaysia, which is part of the Barisan Nasional (BN) coalition. Faisal initially gained attention for his involvement in youth politics, particularly in advocating for the rights and aspirations of the younger generation within the party.

Faisal's rise within UMNO was marked by his deep commitment to promoting unity and strengthening the party's leadership. He served in several important positions within the party’s youth wing. Faisal's early political prominence came when he was appointed as Deputy Director of UMNO Youth. His involvement in key party initiatives and over time, he continued to rise through the ranks. In the mid-2000s, Faisal was appointed as Special Assistant to the Prime Minister of Malaysia. He was later appointed as Information Chief of UMNO, overseeing the party's communication strategies.

Throughout his career, Faisal held several other important positions within the Malaysian government. He served as the Special Officer (Policy) to the Minister of Education under Hishammuddin Hussein from April 2004 until April 2009. He also served as the Special Officer to the Minister of Home Affairs under Ahmad Zahid Hamidi from May 2010 until May 2013.

He held the position of former Exco of the UMNO Malaysia Youth Movement, Chairman of the New Media Unit (UMB) of the UMNO Malaysia Youth Movement (2009–2013) and later Deputy Head of UMNO Putrajaya Division (2018–2023). He also served as the Director of the Community Communications Department (JASA) of the Ministry of Communications and Multimedia (KKMM) from February 2014 until May 2018.

== Personal life ==
Tun Faisal Ismail is married to Norhafilah Mohammad Khawari and have four children, namely Tun Muhammad Daim Alhakim Tun Faisal Ismail, Tun Faiz Al Hakim Tun Faisal Ismail, Tun Farah Asyikin Tun Faisal Ismail and Tun Diana Asyikin Tun Faisal Ismail.

== Election results ==
Negeri Sembilan State Legislative Assembly
| Year | Constituency | Candidate | Votes | Pct | Opponent(s) | Votes | Pct | Ballots cast | Majority | Turnout |
|---|---|---|---|---|---|---|---|---|---|---|
| 2026 | N13 Sikamat | Tun Faisal Ismail Aziz (BERSATU) | 548 | 2.09% | Razali Abu Samah (WAWASAN) | 15,052 | 57.36% | 26,239 | 4,413 | 77.51% |
| 2026 | N13 Sikamat | Tun Faisal Ismail Aziz (BERSATU) | 548 | 2.09% | Nor Azman Mohamad (PKR) | 10,639 | 40.55% | 26,239 | 4,413 | 77.51% |

== Honours ==
=== Honours of Malaysia ===
- Federal Territory (Malaysia)
  - Commander of the Order of the Territorial Crown (PMW) – Datuk (2021)
