= Hasim Rusdi =

Malaysian politician

Yang Berbahagia Dato' Hasim Rusdi DPNS DMSM AMN
- هاشم رشدي

Member of the Negeri Sembilan State Executive Council
- In office 22 May 2013 – 12 May 2018
- Monarch: Muhriz
- Menteri Besar: Mohamad Hasan
- Portfolio: Agriculture and Agro-based Industry
- Preceded by: Yunus Rahmat
- Succeeded by: Bakri Sawir
- Constituency: Labu
- In office 14 March 2008 – 21 May 2013
- Monarchs: Ja'afar (2008); Muhriz (2008–2013)
- Menteri Besar: Mohamad Hasan
- Portfolio: Rural Development, Consumer Affairs and Public Facilities
- Constituency: Labu

Member of the Negeri Sembilan State Legislative Assembly for Labu
- In office 8 March 2008 – 9 May 2018
- Preceded by: Muhammad Sahlan Shaid (BN–UMNO)
- Succeeded by: Ismail Ahmad (PH–PKR)
- Majority: 1,405 (2008); 1,511 (2013)

State Deputy Chairman of the United Malays National Organisation of Negeri Sembilan
- Incumbent
- Assumed office 22 March 2023
- President: Ahmad Zahid Hamidi
- State Chairman: Jalaluddin Alias
- Preceded by: Ismail Lasim

Personal details
- Born: Hasim bin Rusdi Negeri Sembilan, Malaysia
- Party: United Malays National Organisation (UMNO)
- Other political affiliations: Barisan Nasional (BN)
- Spouse: Salamah Shahardin (died 2016)
- Education: University of Putra Malaysia
- Occupation: Politician

Hasim bin Rusdi is a Malaysian politician who served as Member of the Negeri Sembilan State Executive Council (EXCO) in the Barisan Nasional (BN) state administration under former Menteri Besar Mohamad Hasan from March 2008 to the collapse of the BN state administration in May 2018 as well as Member of the Negeri Sembilan State Legislative Assembly (MLA) for Labu from March 2008 to May 2018. He is a member and the Division Chief of Rasah of the United Malays National Organisation (UMNO), a component party of the Barisan Nasional (BN) coalition. He has served as the State Deputy Chairman of UMNO of Negeri Sembilan since March 2023.

== Election results ==
Negeri Sembilan State Legislative Assembly
Year	Constituency	Candidate	Votes	Pct	Opponent(s)	Votes	Pct	Ballots cast	Majority	Turnout
2008	N20 Labu	Hasim Rusdi (UMNO)	5,451	56.18%	Mokhtar Ahmad (PKR)	4,046	41.70%	9,702	1,405	77.76%
2013	N20 Labu	Hasim Rusdi (UMNO)	7,820	60.55%	Mohd Khairil Anuar Mohd Wafa (PAS)	5,571	43.13%	12,916	1,511	85.50%
2018	N20 Labu	Hasim Rusdi (UMNO)	5,830	39.71%	Ismail Ahmad (PKR)	6,712	45.72%	15,006	882	84.30%
2018	N20 Labu	Hasim Rusdi (UMNO)	5,830	39.71%	Mohd Khairil Anuar Mohd Wafa (PAS)	2,093	14.26%	15,006	882	84.30%
2018	N20 Labu	Hasim Rusdi (UMNO)	5,830	39.71%	David Dass Aseerpatham (PAP)	46	0.31%	15,006	882	84.30%

== Honours ==
- Malaysia
  - Member of the Order of the Defender of the Realm (AMN) (2002)
- Malacca
  - Companion Class I of the Exalted Order of Malacca (DMSM) – Datuk (2004)
- Negeri Sembilan
  - Knight Commander of the Order of Loyalty to Negeri Sembilan (DPNS) – Dato' (2011)
