= Razali Abu Samah =

Malaysian politician and retired police officer

Yang Berhormat Datuk Razali Abu Samah DMSM PSPP KMN PPP AAP PPS PPA PJPN MLA
- رازالي ابو سامه

Member of the Negeri Sembilan State Executive Council (Tourism, Arts and Culture)
- Incumbent
- Assumed office 7 August 2026
- Monarch: Muhriz
- Menteri Besar: Ismail Lasim
- Preceded by: Nicole Tan Lee Koon

Member of the Negeri Sembilan State Legislative Assembly for Sikamat
- Incumbent
- Assumed office 1 August 2026
- Preceded by: Aminuddin Harun (PH–PKR)
- Majority: 4,413 (2026)

Personal details
- Born: 16 June 1963 (age 63) Jelebu, Negeri Sembilan, Federation of Malaya
- Party: Independent (until 2026); Parti Wawasan Negara (WAWASAN) (since 2026)
- Other political affiliations: Perikatan Nasional (PN)
- Spouse: Hamsiah Mohd Hanis
- Children: 4
- Education: University of Malaya (Dip)
- Police career
- Allegiance: Malaysia
- Department: Royal Malaysian Police
- Service years: ?–2023
- Rank: Senior Assistant Commissioner

Razali bin Abu Samah (Jawi: رازالي بن ابو سامه; born 16 June 1963) is a Malaysian politician and retired police officer who served as Member of the Negeri Sembilan State Executive Council (EXCO) in the Barisan Nasional (BN) state administration under Menteri Besar Ismail Lasim and Member of the Negeri Sembilan State Legislative Assembly (MLA) for Sikamat since August 2026. Before retiring from police career, he served as Melaka Deputy Police Chief from April 2021 to June 2023.

He is a member of National Vision Party (WAWASAN), which a member of Perikatan Nasional (PN) coalition.

== Career ==
=== Police career ===
During his police career, Razali has served at multiple positions, such as deputy head of Crime Prevention and Community Safety Department, Kuala Lumpur Police in 2018, Serdang District Police Chief in 2020 and Melaka Deputy Police Chief in 2021.

=== Political career ===
In 2026 Negeri Sembilan state election, Razali get contested for Sikamat assemblyman under Perikatan Nasional ticket.

== Election results ==
Negeri Sembilan State Legislative Assembly
Year	Constituency	Candidate	Votes	Pct	Opponent(s)	Votes	Pct	Ballots cast	Majority	Turnout
2026	N13 Sikamat	Razali Abu Samah (WAWASAN)	15,052	57,36%	Nor Azman Mohamad (PKR)	10,639	40.55%	26,239	4,413	76.94%
2026	N13 Sikamat	Razali Abu Samah (WAWASAN)	15,052	57,36%	Tun Faisal Ismail Aziz (BERSATU)	548	2.09%	26,239	4,413	76.94%

== Honours ==
- Malaysia
  - Officer of the Order of the Defender of the Realm (KMN) (2021)
  - Recipient of the Loyal Service Medal (PPS)
  - Recipient of the General Service Medal (PPA)
  - Recipient of the 15th Yang di-Pertuan Agong Installation Medal
  - Recipient of the 16th Yang di-Pertuan Agong Installation Medal
- Royal Malaysia Police
  - Loyal Commander of the Most Gallant Police Order (PSPP)
  - Warrior of the Most Gallant Police Order (PPP)
  - Recipient of the National Hero Service Medal (PJPN)
- Malacca
  - Companion of the Exalted Order of Malacca (DMSM) – Datuk (2021)
- Pahang
  - Member of the Order of Sultan Ahmad Shah of Pahang (AAP) (2016)
