= Siow Chen Pin =

Malaysian politician

Yang Berbahagia Dato' Siow Chen Pin DPNS PMC PJK

Consul-general to Kunming
- In office 10 August 2016 – 31 June 2018

Member of the Negeri Sembilan State Executive Council
- In office 14 March 2008 – 21 May 2013
- Monarchs: Ja'afar; Muhriz
- Menteri Besar: Mohamad Hasan
- Portfolio: New Villages, Urban Wellbeing, Housing and Local Government
- Succeeded by: Manickam Letchuman (New Villages); Jalaluddin Alias (Urban Wellbeing, Housing and Local Government)
- Constituency: Chennah

Member of the Negeri Sembilan State Legislative Assembly for Chennah
- In office 8 March 2008 – 5 May 2013
- Preceded by: Lim Yong (BN–MCA)
- Succeeded by: Loke Siew Fook (PR–DAP)
- Majority: 1,298 (2008)

Personal details
- Born: 1965 (age 60–61)
- Party: Malaysian Chinese Association (MCA)
- Other political affiliations: Barisan Nasional (BN)

Siow Chen Pin is a Malaysian politician and diplomat who served as Consul-general to Kunming from August 2016 to June 2018, Member of the Negeri Sembilan State Executive Council (EXCO) in the Barisan Nasional (BN) state administration under former Menteri Besar Mohamad Hasan from March 2008 to May 2013 as well as Member of the Negeri Sembilan State Legislative Assembly (MLA) for Chennah from March 2008 to May 2013. He is a member of Malaysian Chinese Association (MCA), a component party of Barisan Nasional (BN) coalitions.

== Election results ==
Negeri Sembilan State Legislative Assembly
Year	Constituency	Candidate	Votes	Pct	Opponent(s)	Votes	Pct	Ballots cast	Majority	Turnout
2008	N01 Chennah	Siow Chen Pin (MCA)	4,091	59.43%	How Wee Shiong (DAP)	2,793	40.57%	7,203	1,298	72.77%

== Honours ==
- Negeri Sembilan
  - Knight Commander of the Order of Loyalty to Negeri Sembilan (DPNS) – Dato' (2010)
  - Recipient of the Medal for Outstanding Public Service (PMC) (2006)
  - Recipient of the Meritorious Service Medal (PJK) (2003)
