= Kamarul Baharin Abbas =

Malaysian politician (born 1947)

Yang Berbahagia Dato' Kamarul Baharin Abbas DSSA
- كمرال بهرين عباس

Member of the Malaysian Parliament for Telok Kemang
- In office 8 March 2008 – 9 May 2018
- Preceded by: Sothinathan Sinna Gounder (BN–MIC)
- Succeeded by: Constituency abolished and renamed Port Dickson
- Majority: 2,804 (2008); 1,579 (2013)

Personal details
- Born: 12 June 1947 (age 78) Perak, Federation of Malaya (now Malaysia)
- Citizenship: Malaysian
- Party: People's Justice Party (PKR)
- Other political affiliations: Pakatan Harapan (PH) (2015–present); Pakatan Rakyat (PR) (2008–2015)
- Occupation: Politician

Kamarul Baharin bin Abbas (born 12 June 1947) is a Malaysian politician and the Member of the Parliament of Malaysia for the Telok Kemang constituency in the state of Negeri Sembilan for two terms from 2008 to 2018. He is a member of the People's Justice Party (PKR), a component party in the Pakatan Harapan (PH) coalition.

Kamarul was first elected to Parliament in the 2008 general election winning the seat of Telok Kemang. In doing so he unseated the incumbent member Sothinathan Sinna Gounder from the then still governing Barisan Nasional (BN) coalition. He was re-elected in 2013 general election. Kamarul was state chief of PKR for both the 2008 and 2013 elections. He did not contest in the 2018 general election when the Telok Kemang constituency was abolished and renamed as Port Dickson.

== Election results ==
Selangor State Legislative Assembly
Year	Constituency	Candidate	Votes	Pct	Opponent(s)	Votes	Pct	Ballots cast	Majority	Turnout
2004	N16 Batu Caves	Kamarul Baharin Abbas (PKR)	7,581	44.74%	Jagarasah Verasamy (MIC)	9,362	55.26%	17,318	1,781	73.56%

Parliament of Malaysia
Year	Constituency	Candidate	Votes	Pct	Opponent(s)	Votes	Pct	Ballot casts	Majority	Turnout
2008	P132 Telok Kemang	Kamarul Baharin Abbas (PKR)	23,348	52.48%	Sothinathan Sinna Gounder (MIC)	20,544	46.17%	46,613	2,804	77.45%
2008	P132 Telok Kemang	Kamarul Baharin Abbas (PKR)	23,348	52.48%	Mohd Rashid Arshad (IND)	601	1.35%	46,613	2,804	77.45%
2013	P132 Telok Kemang	Kamarul Baharin Abbas (PKR)	29,848	51.01%	Mogan Velayatham (MIC)	28,269	48.31%	59,984	1,579	85.05%
2013	P132 Telok Kemang	Kamarul Baharin Abbas (PKR)	29,848	51.01%	Kamarudin Kumaravel Abdullah (IND)	394	0.67%	59,984	1,579	85.05%

Negeri Sembilan State Legislative Assembly
Year	Constituency	Candidate	Votes	Pct	Opponent(s)	Votes	Pct	Ballots cast	Majority	Turnout
2013	N14 Ampangan	Kamarul Baharin Abbas (PKR)	7,101	49.69%	Abu Ubaidah Redza (UMNO)	7,190	50.31%	14,525	89	85.80%

== Honours ==
- Selangor
  - Knight Companion of the Order of Sultan Salahuddin Abdul Aziz Shah (DSSA) – Dato' (1996)

== See also ==
- Telok Kemang (federal constituency)
