= Mohamad Hanifah Abu Baker =

Malaysian politician and businessman

- محمد حنيفة أبو بكر

State Leader of the Opposition of Negeri Sembilan
- In office 21 March 2024 – 1 August 2026
- Monarch: Muhriz
- Menteri Besar: Aminuddin Harun
- Preceded by: Ridzuan Ahmad
- Succeeded by: TBD
- Constituency: Labu

3rd State Chairman of the Perikatan Nasional of Negeri Sembilan
- In office 12 February 2024 – 1 January 2026
- National Chairman: Muhyiddin Yassin
- State Advisor: Eddin Syazlee Shith (17 February–20 September 2024)
- Preceded by: Ahmad Faizal Azumu
- Succeeded by: TBD

3rd State Chairman of the Malaysian United Indigenous Party of Negeri Sembilan
- Incumbent
- Assumed office 28 January 2024
- President: Muhyiddin Yassin
- Preceded by: Ahmad Faizal Azumu

Member of the Negeri Sembilan State Legislative Assembly for Labu
- In office 12 August 2023 – 1 August 2026
- Preceded by: Ismail Ahmad (PH–PKR)
- Succeeded by: Siti Nur Umaira Hasim (BN–UMNO)
- Majority: 1,640 (2023)

Personal details
- Born: Mohamad Hanifah bin Abu Baker; 16 October 1980 (age 45) Felda Palong 2, Gemas, Tampin, Negeri Sembilan, Malaysia
- Citizenship: Malaysian
- Party: Malaysian United Indigenous Party (BERSATU)
- Other political affiliations: Perikatan Nasional (PN)
- Children: 4
- Education: Felda Palong 2 National Primary School, Felda Palong 2 National Secondary School
- Alma mater: Japan Malaysia Technical Institute (Diploma in operations management)
- Occupation: Politician; businessman

Mohamad Hanifah bin Abu Baker (born 16 October 1980) is a Malaysian politician and businessman who served as State Leader of the Opposition of Negeri Sembilan from March 2024 to August 2026 and Member of the Negeri Sembilan State Legislative Assembly (MLA) for Labu from August 2023 to August 2026. He is a member and Division Chief of Rasah of the Malaysian United Indigenous Party (BERSATU), a component party of the Perikatan Nasional (PN) coalition. He has served as the State Chairman of BERSATU of Negeri Sembilan since January 2024. He was the 3rd State Chairman of PN of Negeri Sembilan from February 2024 to his resignation in January 2026, State Treasurer of PN of Negeri Sembilan prior to his promotion to the state chairmanship in February 2024 and managing director of the real estate-based Zulfikar Holdings Sdn Bhd.

== Political career ==
=== State Leader of the Opposition of Negeri Sembilan (since 2024) ===
On 21 March 2024, Mohamad Hanifah was appointed as the State Leader of the Opposition of Negeri Sembilan, taking over from Gemas MLA, Ridzuan Ahmad of PN. He has also tasked and entrusted all five Negeri Sembilan PN MLAs including himself to monitor the portfolios of the state government of Negeri Sembilan to ensure the good governance of the state.

=== Member of the Negeri Sembilan State Legislative Assembly (since 2023) ===
==== 2023 Negeri Sembilan state election ====
In the 2023 Negeri Sembilan state election, Mohamad Hanifah made his electoral debut after being nominated by PN to contest for the Labu state seat. He was elected to the Negeri Sembilan Assembly as the Labu MLA after defeating defending MLA Ismail Ahmad of Pakatan Harapan (PH) by a majority of 1,640 votes. He later attributed his victory in Labu to the groundwork of welfare programmes that he had undertaken and assistance packages that he had channelled in Rasah since 2020.

=== State Chairman of Perikatan Nasional and Malaysian United Indigenous Party of Negeri Sembilan (since 2024) ===
On 28 January 2024, Mohamad Hanifah was named the 3rd State Chairman of BERSATU of Negeri Sembilan, replacing Ahmad Faizal Azumu who was also the Deputy President of BERSATU. On 12 February 2024, he was further made the 3rd State Chairman of PN of Negeri Sembilan, also to succeed Ahmad Faizal. On 17 February 2024, he appointed new Negeri Sembilan PN committee members, with 1st State Chairman Eddin Syazlee Shith being given a newly established position of State Advisor.

On 30 December 2025, Mohamad Hanifah announced his resignation as the Negeri Sembilan PN chief of Perikatan Nasional (PN), following the resignation of PN president Muhyiddin Yassin.

== Election results ==
Negeri Sembilan State Legislative Assembly
| Year | Constituency | Candidate | Votes | Pct | Opponent(s) | Votes | Pct | Ballots cast | Majority | Turnout |
|---|---|---|---|---|---|---|---|---|---|---|
| 2023 | N20 Labu | Mohamad Hanifah Abu Baker (BERSATU) | 11,661 | 53.78% | Ismail Ahmad (PKR) | 10,021 | 46.22% | 21,682 | 1,640 | 71.14% |
| 2026 | N20 Labu | Mohamad Hanifah Abu Baker (BERSATU) | 1,985 | 7.90% | Siti Nur Umaira Hasim (UMNO) | 14,209 | 56.56% | 25,124 | 5,279 | 77.18% |
| 2026 | N20 Labu | Mohamad Hanifah Abu Baker (BERSATU) | 1,985 | 7.90% | Ahmad Faez Abdul Razak (PKR) | 8,930 | 35.54% | 25,124 | 5,279 | 77.18% |
