= Mohd Zaidy Abdul Kadir =

Malaysian politician

Yang Berhormat Dato' Mohd Zaidy Abdul Kadir DIMP MLA
- محمّد زيدي عبد القادر

Member of the Negeri Sembilan State Legislative Assembly for Jeram Padang
- Incumbent
- Assumed office 12 August 2023
- Preceded by: Manickam Letchuman (BN–MIC)
- Majority: 693 (2023); 4,482 (2026)

Personal details
- Born: Mohd Zaidy bin Abdul Kadir
- Citizenship: Malaysian
- Party: United Malays National Organisation (UMNO)
- Other political affiliations: Barisan Nasional (BN)
- Occupation: Politician

Mohd Zaidy bin Abdul Kadir is a Malaysian politician who has served as Member of the Negeri Sembilan State Legislative Assembly (MLA) for Jeram Padang since August 2023. He is a member of the United Malays National Organisation (UMNO), a component party of the Barisan Nasional (BN) coalition. He was the State Youth Chief of UMNO of Negeri Sembilan and the Division Youth Chief of UMNO of Jempol. He is the first non-Indian and UMNO Jeram Padang MLA in history.

== Election results ==
Negeri Sembilan State Legislative Assembly
Year	Constituency	Candidate	Votes	Pct	Opponent(s)	Votes	Pct	Ballots cast	Majority	Turnout
2023	N07 Jeram Padang	Mohd Zaidy Abdul Kadir (UMNO)	5,462	53.39%	Surash Sreenivasan (BERSATU)	4,769	46.61%	10,358	693	63.42%
2026	N07 Jeram Padang	Mohd Zaidy Abdul Kadir (UMNO)	6,854	59.11%	Manivannan Gowindasamy (PKR)	2,372	20.46%	11,869	4,482	71.54%
2026	N07 Jeram Padang	Mohd Zaidy Abdul Kadir (UMNO)	6,854	59.11%	Sri Sanjeevan Ramakrishnan (BERSATU)	2,191	18.89%	11,869	4,482	71.54%
2026	N07 Jeram Padang	Mohd Zaidy Abdul Kadir (UMNO)	6,854	59.11%	Dayana Dal (ASLI)	179	1.54%	11,869	4,482	71.54%

== Honours ==
- Pahang
  - Knight Companion of the Order of the Crown of Pahang (DIMP) – Dato' (2014)
