= Mohamad Rafie Abdul Malek =

Malaysian politician

Yang Berbahagia Dato' Mohamad Rafie Abdul Malek DPNS
- محمد رافعي عبدالمالك

Member of the Negeri Sembilan State Executive Council (Investment, Industry, Entrepreneurship, Education & Human Capital)
- In office 23 May 2018 – 14 August 2023
- Monarch: Muhriz
- Menteri Besar: Aminuddin Harun
- Preceded by: Mohamad Hasan (Menteri Besar, Investment, Industry & Entrepreneurships); Shamshulkahar Mohd. Deli (Education); Zaifulbahri Idris (Human Capital)
- Succeeded by: Aminuddin Harun (Menteri Besar, Investment); Teo Kok Seong (Industry); Veerapan Superamaniam (Entrepreneurship); Ismail Lasim (Education & Human Capital)
- Constituency: Ampangan

Member of the Negeri Sembilan State Legislative Assembly for Ampangan
- In office 9 May 2018 – 12 August 2023
- Preceded by: Abu Ubaidah Redza (BN–UMNO) Tengku Zamrah Tengku Sulaiman (PH–PKR)
- Succeeded by: Tengku Zamrah Tengku Sulaiman (PH–PKR)
- Majority: 1,360 (2018) 3,969 (2026)

Faction represented in the Negeri Sembilan State Legislative Assembly
- 2018–2023: Pakatan Harapan

Personal details
- Born: Mohamad Rafie bin Abdul Malek; 8 July 1964 (age 62) Negeri Sembilan, Malaysia
- Party: People's Justice Party (PKR) (1999–2023); Independent (2023–2026); PAS (since 2026)
- Other political affiliations: Barisan Alternatif (BA) (1999–2004); Pakatan Rakyat (PR) (2008–2015); Pakatan Harapan (PH) (2015–2023); Perikatan Nasional (PN) (since 2026)
- Occupation: Politician

Mohamad Rafie bin Abdul Malek is a Malaysian politician who served as Member of the Negeri Sembilan State Executive Council (EXCO) in the Pakatan Harapan (PH) state administration under Menteri Besar Aminuddin Harun as well as current Member of the Negeri Sembilan State Legislative Assembly (MLA) for Ampangan from May 2018 to August 2023 and from August 2026 to present. He is a member of Malaysian Islamic Party (PAS) and was a member of the People's Justice Party (PKR), a component party of the PH and formerly Pakatan Rakyat (PR) and Barisan Alternatif (BA) coalitions.

== Election results ==
Negeri Sembilan State Legislative Assembly
Year	Constituency	Candidate	Votes	Pct	Opponent(s)	Votes	Pct	Ballots cast	Majority	Turnout
1999	N20 Seremban Jaya	Mohamad Rafie Abdul Malek (keADILan)	7,070	43.68%	Woo Ah Lek (GERAKAN)	9,115	56.32%	16,912	2,045	76.28%
2004	N14 Ampangan	Mohamad Rafie Abdul Malek (PKR)	3,353	31.13%	Zakaria Nordin (UMNO)	7,418	68.87%	11,009	4,065	72.00%
2018	N14 Ampangan	Mohamad Rafie Abdul Malek (PKR)	6,801	51.39%	Abu Ubaidah Redza (UMNO)	5,441	39.71%	13,443	1,360	85.10%
2018	N14 Ampangan	Mohamad Rafie Abdul Malek (PKR)	6,801	51.39%	Mustaffa Daharun (PAS)	983	8.90%	13,443	1,360	85.10%
2023	N14 Ampangan	Mohamad Rafie Abdul Malek (IND)	3,079	20.72%	Tengku Zamrah Tengku Sulaiman (PKR)	6,054	40.75%	14,858	329	70.78%
2023	N14 Ampangan	Mohamad Rafie Abdul Malek (IND)	3,079	20.72%	Muhammad Ghazali Zainal Abidin (BERSATU)	5,725	38.53%	14,858	329	70.78%
2026	N14 Ampangan	Mohamad Rafie Abdul Malek (PAS)	9,934	61.45%	Muhammad Nazri Kassim (PKR)	5,965	36.90%	16,166	3,969	
2026	N14 Ampangan	Mohamad Rafie Abdul Malek (PAS)	9,934	61.45%	Noor'azzah Harun (BERSATU)	267	1.65%	16,166	3,969	

== Honours ==
- Negeri Sembilan
  - Knight Commander of the Order of Loyalty to Negeri Sembilan (DPNS) – Dato' (2020)
