= Yap Yew Weng =

Malaysian politician

Yang Berhormat Tuan Yap Yew Weng MLA
- 叶耀荣

Member of the Negeri Sembilan State Legislative Assembly for Mambau
- In office 5 May 2013 – 1 August 2026
- Preceded by: Wong May May (PR–DAP)
- Succeeded by: Lee Kai Yet (PH–DAP)
- Majority: 9,377 (2013); 12,389 (2018); 14,940 (2023)

Member of the Negeri Sembilan State Legislative Assembly for Nilai
- In office 8 March 2008 – 5 May 2013
- Preceded by: Peter Lai Yit Fee (BN–MCA)
- Succeeded by: Arul Kumar Jambunathan (PR–DAP)
- Majority: 1,894 (2008)

Personal details
- Born: 27 December 1963 (age 62) Masjid Tanah, Malacca
- Party: Democratic Action Party (DAP)
- Other political affiliations: Pakatan Rakyat (PR) (2008–2015); Pakatan Harapan (PH) (since 2015)
- Occupation: Politician

Yap Yew Weng is a Malaysian politician who served as a Member of the Negeri Sembilan State Legislative Assembly (MLA) for Mambau from May 2013 to August 2026 and for Nilai from 2008 to May 2013. He is a member of the Democratic Action Party (DAP), a component party of the Pakatan Harapan (PH) and formerly Pakatan Rakyat (PR) coalitions.

== Election results ==
Negeri Sembilan State Legislative Assembly
| Year | Constituency | Candidate | Votes | Pct | Opponent(s) | Votes | Pct | Ballots cast | Majority | Turnout |
|---|---|---|---|---|---|---|---|---|---|---|
| 2004 | N12 Temiang | Yap Yew Weng (DAP) | 3,260 | 43.82% | Lee Yuen Fong (MCA) | 4,179 | 56.18% | 7,637 | 919 | 71.59% |
| 2008 | N10 Nilai | Yap Yew Weng (DAP) | 6,755 | 58.15% | Peter Lai Yit Fee (MCA) | 4,861 | 41.85% | 11,909 | 1,894 | 74.39% |
| 2013 | N23 Mambau | Yap Yew Weng (DAP) | 13,518 | 76.55% | Hoi Choi Sin (MCA) | 4,141 | 23.45% | 17,915 | 9,377 | 87.22% |
| 2018 | N23 Mambau | Yap Yew Weng (DAP) | 14,911 | 85.04% | Hoi Choi Sin (MCA) | 2,522 | 14.38% | 17,752 | 12,389 | 85.47% |
| 2018 | N23 Mambau | Yap Yew Weng (DAP) | 14,911 | 85.04% | T. Parimala Devi (PAP) | 101 | 0.58% | 17,752 | 12,389 | 85.47% |
| 2023 | N23 Mambau | Yap Yew Weng (DAP) | 17,039 | 88.28% | Satesh Kumar Nillamiam (PAS) | 2,099 | 10.88% | 19,456 | 14,940 | 67.20% |
| 2023 | N23 Mambau | Yap Yew Weng (DAP) | 17,039 | 88.28% | Kumaravel Ramiah (IND) | 163 | 0.84% | 19,456 | 14,940 | 67.20% |
