= Arul Kumar Jambunathan =

Malaysian politician

Yang Berhormat Tuan Arul Kumar Jambunathan MLA
- அருள் குமார் ஜம்புநாதன்

Member of the Negeri Sembilan State Executive Council
- In office 24 August 2023 – 1 August 2026
- Monarch: Muhriz
- Menteri Besar: Aminuddin Harun
- Portfolio: Housing and Local Government & Public Transport
- Preceded by: Teo Kok Seong
- Succeeded by: Siow Kong Choon (Housing and Local Government)
- Constituency: Nilai
- In office 23 May 2018 – 26 January 2023
- Monarch: Muhriz
- Menteri Besar: Aminuddin Harun
- Portfolio: Human Resources, Plantations & Non-Muslim Affairs
- Preceded by: Manickam Letchuman (Human Resources & Plantations)
- Succeeded by: Chew Seh Yong
- Constituency: Nilai

Political Secretary to the Minister of Transport
- In office 27 January 2023 – 23 August 2023
- Prime Minister: Anwar Ibrahim
- Minister: Anthony Loke Siew Fook
- Preceded by: Ling Tian Soon
- Succeeded by: Ho Weng Wah

Member of the Negeri Sembilan State Legislative Assembly for Nilai
- Incumbent
- Assumed office 5 May 2013
- Preceded by: Yap Yew Weng (PR–DAP)
- Majority: 4,047 (2013); 9,825 (2018); 10,889 (2023); 5,937 (2026)

National Vice Chairman of the Democratic Action Party
- Incumbent
- Assumed office 16 March 2025 Serving with: Chong Chieng Jen &; Teo Nie Ching &; Ng Suee Lim &; Syahredzan Johan
- National Chairman: Gobind Singh Deo
- Secretary-General: Anthony Loke Siew Fook

State Chairman of the Democratic Action Party of Negeri Sembilan
- Incumbent
- Assumed office 10 August 2026
- Deputy: Gunasekaren Palasamy
- National Chairman: Gobind Singh Deo
- Secretary-General: Anthony Loke Siew Fook
- Preceded by: Anthony Loke Siew Fook

State Vice Chairman of the Democratic Action Party of Negeri Sembilan
- In office 29 September 2024 – 10 August 2026 Serving with Teo Kok Seong
- Secretary-General: Anthony Loke Siew Fook
- State Chairman: Anthony Loke Siew Fook
- Preceded by: Kesavadas Achyuthan Nair
- Succeeded by: TBD

Faction represented in the Negeri Sembilan State Legislative Assembly
- 2013–2018: Democratic Action Party
- 2018–: Pakatan Harapan

Personal details
- Born: Arul Kumar a/l Jambunathan; 12 September 1985 (age 40) Tampin, Negeri Sembilan, Malaysia
- Citizenship: Malaysia
- Party: Democratic Action Party (DAP)
- Other political affiliations: Pakatan Rakyat (PR) (2008–2015); Pakatan Harapan (PH) (since 2015)
- Education: University of Putra Malaysia (BBA)
- Occupation: Politician

Arul Kumar s/o Jambunathan (born 12 September 1985) is a Malaysian politician who served as Member of the Negeri Sembilan State Legislative Assembly (MLA) for Nilai since May 2013. He served as Member of the Negeri Sembilan State Executive Council (EXCO) in the Pakatan Harapan (PH) state administration under former Menteri Besar Aminuddin Harun from May 2018 to his resignation in January 2023 and from August 2023 to August 2026. He also served as Political Secretary to the Minister of Transport Anthony Loke Siew Fook from January 2023 to August 2023. He is a member of the Democratic Action Party (DAP), a component party of the PH coalition. He has served as the National Vice Chairman of DAP since March 2025 and the State Chairman of DAP of Negeri Sembilan since August 2026. He served as the State Vice Chairman of DAP of Negeri Sembilan from September 2024 to his promotion to the state chairmanship in August 2026.

== Election results ==
Negeri Sembilan State Legislative Assembly
| Year | Constituency | Candidate | Votes | Pct | Opponent(s) | Votes | Pct | Ballots cast | Majority | Turnout% |
|---|---|---|---|---|---|---|---|---|---|---|
| 2013 | N10 Nilai | Arul Kumar Jambunathan (DAP) | 10,378 | 59.79% | Gan Chee Biow (MCA) | 6,331 | 39.14% | 17,573 | 4,047 | 85.30% |
| 2013 | N10 Nilai | Arul Kumar Jambunathan (DAP) | 10,378 | 59.79% | Ahmad Kamarulzaman Abu (IND) | 490 | 1.07% | 17,573 | 4,047 | 85.30% |
| 2013 | N10 Nilai | Arul Kumar Jambunathan (DAP) | 10,378 | 59.79% | S. Karupiah @ Rajashegher K. Sithambam (IND) | 47 | 1.07% | 17,573 | 4,047 | 85.30% |
| 2018 | N10 Nilai | Arul Kumar Jambunathan (DAP) | 14,219 | 63.49% | Leaw Kok Chan (MCA) | 4,394 | 21.67% | 21,025 | 9,825 | 85.30% |
| 2018 | N10 Nilai | Arul Kumar Jambunathan (DAP) | 14,219 | 63.49% | Mohd Abu Zahrim Abdul Rahman (PAS) | 2,151 | 14.84% | 21,025 | 9,825 | 85.30% |
| 2023 | N10 Nilai | Arul Kumar Jambunathan (DAP) | 19,133 | 66.29% | Gan Chee Biow (BERSATU) | 8,244 | 28.56% | 29,067 | 10,889 | 68.93% |
| 2023 | N10 Nilai | Arul Kumar Jambunathan (DAP) | 19,133 | 66.29% | Omar Mohd Isa (IND) | 1,430 | 4.95% | 29,067 | 10,889 | 68.93% |
| 2023 | N10 Nilai | Arul Kumar Jambunathan (DAP) | 19,133 | 66.29% | Yessu Samuel (IND) | 57 | 0.20% | 29,067 | 10,889 | 68.93% |
| 2026 | N10 Nilai | Arul Kumar Jambunathan (DAP) | 15,797 | 48.78% | Lai Chien Kong (MCA) | 9,860 | 30.45% | 32,386 | 5,937 | 70.54% |
| 2026 | N10 Nilai | Arul Kumar Jambunathan (DAP) | 15,797 | 48.78% | Zamani Ibrahim (BERJASA) | 5,844 | 18.04% | 32,386 | 5,937 | 70.54% |
| 2026 | N10 Nilai | Arul Kumar Jambunathan (DAP) | 15,797 | 48.78% | Saravana Kumar Veerasamy (BERSATU) | 718 | 2.22% | 32,386 | 5,937 | 70.54% |
| 2026 | N10 Nilai | Arul Kumar Jambunathan (DAP) | 15,797 | 48.78% | Omar Mohd Isa (IND) | 167 | 0.52% | 32,386 | 5,937 | 70.54% |
