= Tengku Zamrah Tengku Sulaiman =

Malaysian politician

Yang Mulia Dato' Hajah Tengku Zamrah binti Tengku Sulaiman DPNS
- تڠكو زمرة تڠكو سليمان

Member of the Negeri Sembilan State Executive Council
- In office 24 August 2023 – 2 August 2026; Health, Unity, Information, National Integration and Non-Government Organisations (NGO)
- Monarch: Muhriz
- Menteri Besar: Aminuddin Harun
- Preceded by: Veerapan Superamaniam (Health); Choo Ken Hwa (Information, National Unity and Integration) portfolio established (Non-Government Organisations (NGO))
- Succeeded by: Suhaimizan Bizar
- Constituency: Ampangan

Member of the Negeri Sembilan State Legislative Assembly for Ampangan
- In office 12 August 2023 – 1 August 2026
- Preceded by: Mohamad Rafie Abdul Malek (PH–PKR)
- Succeeded by: Mohamad Rafie Abdul Malek (PN-PAS)
- Majority: 329 (2023)

Personal details
- Party: People's Justice Party (PKR)
- Other political affiliations: Pakatan Harapan (PH)
- Education: Handsworth College
- Occupation: Politician

Tengku Zamrah binti Tengku Sulaiman is a Malaysian politician who served as Member of the Negeri Sembilan State Executive Council (EXCO) in the Pakatan Harapan (PH) state administration under Menteri Besar Aminuddin Harun from August 2023 to August 2026 as well as Member of the Negeri Sembilan State Legislative Assembly (MLA) for Ampangan from August 2023 to August 2026. She is a member and Women Chief of Seremban Division of the People's Justice Party (PKR), a component party of Pakatan Harapan (PH).

== Political career ==
Tengku Zamrah won the seat of Ampangan in 2023. She was appointed as exco in charge of Health, Unity, Information, National Integration and NGOs portfolio.

== Election results ==
Negeri Sembilan State Legislative Assembly
Year	Constituency	Candidate	Votes	Pct	Opponent(s)	Votes	Pct	Ballots cast	Majority	Turnout
2013	N16 Seri Menanti	Tengku Zamrah Tengku Sulaiman (PKR)	2,142	31.58%	Abdul Samad Ibrahim (UMNO)	4,538	66.90%	6,937	2,396	84.40%
2013	N16 Seri Menanti	Tengku Zamrah Tengku Sulaiman (PKR)	2,142	31.58%	Md Ali Mustafa (IND)	103	1.52%	6,937	2,396	84.40%
2023	N14 Ampangan	Tengku Zamrah Tengku Sulaiman (PKR)	6,054	40.75%	Muhammad Ghazali Zainal Abidin (BERSATU)	5,725	38.53%	14,858	329	70.78%
2023	N14 Ampangan	Tengku Zamrah Tengku Sulaiman (PKR)	6,054	40.75%	Mohamad Rafie Abdul Malek (IND)	3,079	20.72%	14,858	329	70.78%

== Honours ==
- Negeri Sembilan
  - Knight Commander of the Order of Loyalty to Negeri Sembilan (DPNS) – Dato' (2025)
