= S. Sothinathan =

Malaysian politician

Yang Berbahagia Dato' Sothinathan Sinna Goundar DSNS

Deputy Minister of Natural Resources and Environment
- In office 27 March 2004 – 18 March 2008
- Monarchs: Sirajuddin; Mizan Zainal Abidin
- Prime Minister: Abdullah Ahmad Badawi
- Minister: Adenan Satem (2004–2006); Azmi Khalid (2006–2008)
- Preceded by: Zainal Dahlan (Deputy Minister of Science, Technology and Environment)
- Succeeded by: Maznah Mazlan
- Constituency: Telok Kemang

Member of the Malaysian Parliament for Telok Kemang
- In office 10 June 2000 – 8 March 2008
- Preceded by: S. A. Anpalagan (BN–MIC)
- Succeeded by: Kamarul Baharin Abbas (PR–PKR)
- Majority: 5,972 (2000); 17,777 (2004)

Personal details
- Born: Sothinathan s/o Sinna Goundar; 4 April 1960 (age 66) Port Dickson, Negeri Sembilan, Malaysia
- Party: Malaysian Indian Congress (MIC) (–2018)
- Other political affiliations: Barisan Nasional (BN) (–2018)

Sothinathan s/o Sinna Goundar (Tamil: எஸ். சோதிநாதன், romanized: Es. Cōtinātaṉ; born 4 April 1960) or known as S. Sothinathan, is a Malaysian Politician of Indian Tamil origin. He was also vice-president of the Malaysian Indian Congress, a component party of the Barisan Nasional ruling coalition. He was formerly the Deputy Minister of Natural Resources and Environment.

== Early life ==
Sothinathan was born on 4 April 1960.

== Political career ==
Sothinathan made his first electoral debut in 2000 Telok Kemang by-election following death of its MP S. A. Anpalagan on 10 June 2000. He successfully elected as MP for Telok Kemang in 2004 general election. In 2005, Sothinathan was temporarily suspended for his criticism of the Barisan Nasional government during parliamentary debate when he got up to argue the fate of many Malaysian Indian medical students in Ukraine who were left stranded when their university was derecognized by the Government of Malaysia. His actions were criticised by many BN leaders but won much praise by Malaysian Indians, who saw him as fighting for their rights.

However, he lost his Teluk Kemang parliamentary seat in 2008 Malaysian general elections, which saw the ruling coalition losing 82 parliamentary seats out of 222 seats to the opposition.

In 2018, Sothinathan announced his campaign for PKR President and Leader of Pakatan Harapan Anwar Ibrahim in the Port Dickson by-election. He also stated that he had already quit MIC.

== Election results ==
Parliament of Malaysia
| Year | Constituency | Candidate | Votes | Pct | Opponent(s) | Votes | Pct | Ballot casts | Majority | Turnout |
|---|---|---|---|---|---|---|---|---|---|---|
| 2000 | P119 Telok Kemang | Sothinathan Sinna (MIC) | 24,500 | 56.94% | Ruslan Kasim (keADILan) | 18,528 | 43.06% | 44,079 | 5,972 | 66.14% |
| 2004 | P132 Telok Kemang | Sothinathan Sinna (MIC) | 28,494 | 72.67% | Ab Manap Sahardin (PKR) | 10,717 | 27.33% | 41,189 | 17,777 | 72.95% |
| 2008 | P132 Telok Kemang | Sothinathan Sinna (MIC) | 20,544 | 46.17% | Kamarul Baharin Abbas (PKR) | 23,348 | 52.48% | 46,613 | 2,804 | 77.45% |
| 2008 | P132 Telok Kemang | Sothinathan Sinna (MIC) | 20,544 | 46.17% | Mohd Rashid Arshad (IND) | 601 | 1.35% | 46,613 | 2,804 | 77.45% |

== Honours ==
- Negeri Sembilan
  - Knight Companion of the Order of Loyalty to Negeri Sembilan (DSNS) – Dato' (2004)
