= Mohd Fairuz Mohd Isa =

Malaysian politician

Yang Berhormat Tuan Mohd Fairuz Mohd Isa MLA
- محمد فيروز محمد عيسى
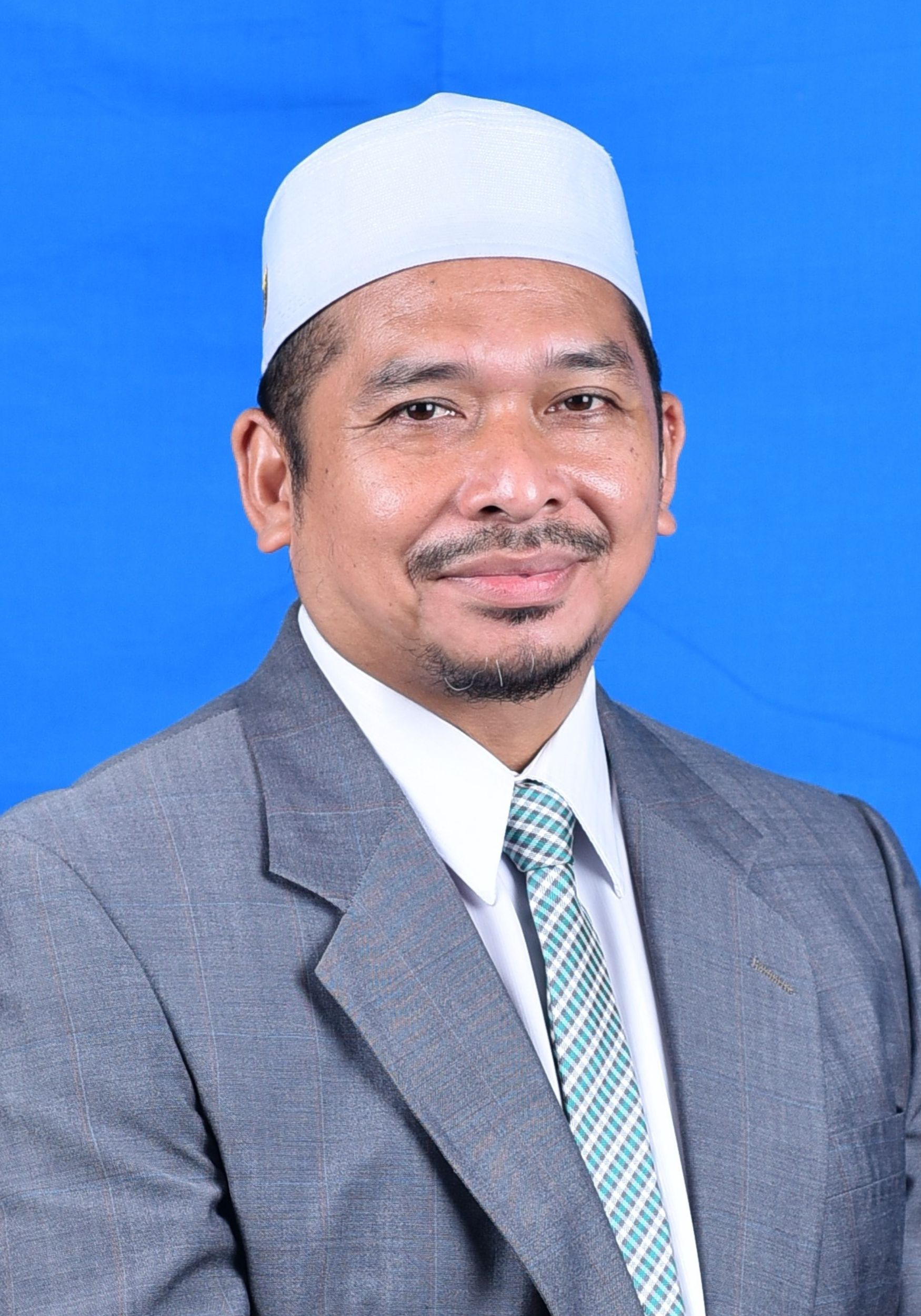

Member of the Negeri Sembilan State Executive Council
- Incumbent
- Assumed office 7 August 2026
- Monarch: Muhriz
- Menteri Besar: Ismail Lasim
- Portfolio: Entrepreneurship, Human Resources, Climate Change, Cooperatives & Consumerism
- Preceded by: Veerapan Superamaniam
- Constituency: Serting

Member of the Negeri Sembilan State Legislative Assembly for Serting
- Incumbent
- Assumed office 12 August 2023
- Preceded by: Shamshulkahar Mohd Deli (BN–UMNO)
- Majority: 843 (2023); 12,115 (2026)

Division Chairman of PAS of the Jempol
- Incumbent
- Assumed office 2018
- State Commissioner: Rafiei Mustapha
- Preceded by: Mustaffa Daharun

Personal details
- Born: Mohd Fairuz bin Mohd Isa Batu Kikir, Jempol, Negeri Sembilan, Malaysia
- Citizenship: Malaysia
- Party: Malaysian Islamic Party (PAS)
- Other political affiliations: Gagasan Sejahtera (GS) (2016–2020); Perikatan Nasional (PN) (since 2020)
- Occupation: Politician

Mohd Fairuz bin Mohd Isa is a Malaysian politician who has served as Member of the Negeri Sembilan State Executive Council (EXCO) under Menteri Besar Ismail Lasim since August 2026 and Member of the Negeri Sembilan State Legislative Assembly (MLA) for Serting since August 2023. He is a member of Malaysian Islamic Party (PAS), a component party of Perikatan Nasional (PN) formerly Gagasan Sejahtera (GS) coalitions. He is the State Commissioner of PAS of Negeri Sembilan. He has been the Division Chairman of the Malaysia Islamic Party of Jempol since 2018 replacing Mustaffa Daharun who died.

== Election results ==
Negeri Sembilan State Legislative Assembly
Year	Constituency	Candidate	Votes	Pct	Opponent(s)	Votes	Pct	Ballots cast	Majority	Turnout
2018	N07 Jeram Padang	Mohd Fairuz Mohd Isa (PAS)	785	8.33%	Manickam Letchuman (MIC)	3,702	39.26%	9,844	1,062	79.80%
2018	N07 Jeram Padang	Mohd Fairuz Mohd Isa (PAS)	785	8.33%	Surash Sreenivasan (IND)	2,640	28.00%	9,844	1,062	79.80%
2018	N07 Jeram Padang	Mohd Fairuz Mohd Isa (PAS)	785	8.33%	S Musliadi Sabtu (PKR)	2,302	24.41%	9,844	1,062	79.80%
2023	N05 Serting	Mohd Fairuz Mohd Isa (PAS)	10,312	52.13%	Muhamad Zamri Omar (UMNO)	9,469	47.87%	19,957	843	65.89%
2026	N05 Serting	Mohd Fairul Mohd Isa (PAS)	16,608	76.05%	Yaacob Mahmood (AMANAH)	4,493	20.58%	22,118	12,115	72.30%
2026	N05 Serting	Mohd Fairul Mohd Isa (PAS)	16,608	76.05%	Muhammad Noraffendy bin Mohd Salleh (BERSATU)	736	3.37%	22,118	12,115	72.30%
