= Ampangan (state constituency) =

Electoral district in Malaysia,

Ampangan (N14)
Negeri Sembilan constituency

State constituency
- Legislature: Negeri Sembilan State Legislative Assembly
MLA
Mohamad Rafie Abdul Malek
PN
- Constituency created: 1986
- First contested: 1986
- Last contested: 2026

Demographics
- Electors (2023): 20,992

N14 Ampangan within Negeri Sembilan, as used for the 2023 and 2026 state elections

Ampangan is a state constituency in Negeri Sembilan, Malaysia, that has been represented in the Negeri Sembilan State Legislative Assembly.

The state constituency was first contested in 1986 and is mandated to return a single Assemblyman to the Negeri Sembilan State Legislative Assembly under the first-past-the-post voting system.

== Demographics ==
Ethnic breakdown of Ampangan's electorate as of 2026
1. Malay (72.8%)
2. Chinese (15.6%)
3. Indian (8.30%)
4. Other ethnicities (3.40%)

== History ==
=== Polling districts ===
According to the federal gazette issued on 23 July 2026, the Ampangan constituency is divided into 6 polling districts.

State constituency	Polling district	Code	Location
Ampangan (N14)	Medan Rahang	128/14/01	Kolej Mara Seremban
Ampangan (N14)	Ampangan	128/14/02	SK K.G.V Seremban
Ampangan (N14)	Kampong Gedong Lalang	128/14/03	Kolej Vokesional Ampangan
Ampangan (N14)	Taman Dato Shahbandar	128/14/04	SK Ampangan; SK Seri Kelana; Dewan Besar Gedong Lalang 50
Ampangan (N14)	Dusun Nyior	128/14/05	SK Taman Dusun Nyior
Ampangan (N14)	Kampong Jiboi	128/14/06	SMA Makmor Ampangan Seremban; SA Rakyat Kampung Baru Blok C Ampangan

=== Representation history ===
Member of the Legislative Assembly for Ampangan
Assembly	No	Years	Member	Party
Constituency created from Pantai and Sungai Ujong
7th	N18	1986-1990	Khatimah Ibrahim	BN (UMNO)
8th	N18	1990-1995	Dermataksiah Abdul Jalil	BN (UMNO)
9th	N21	1995-1999	Dermataksiah Abdul Jalil	BN (UMNO)
10th	N21	1999-2004	Zakaria Nordin	BN (UMNO)
11th	N14	2004-2008	Zakaria Nordin	BN (UMNO)
12th	N14	2008-2013	Rashid Latiff	PR (PKR)
13th	N14	2013-2018	Abu Ubaidah Redza	BN (UMNO)
14th	N14	2018-2023	Mohamad Rafie Abdul Malek	PH (PKR)
15th	N14	2023–2026	Tengku Zamrah Tengku Sulaiman	PH (PKR)
16th	N14	2026–present	Mohamad Rafie Abdul Malek	PN (PAS)

== Election results ==
Negeri Sembilan state election, 2026
Party	Candidate	Votes	%	∆%
PN	Mohamad Rafie Abdul Malek	9,934	61.45	▲22.92
PH	Muhammad Nazri Kassim	5,965	36.90	▼3.85
BERSATU	Noor'azzah Harun	267	1.65	▲1.65
Total valid votes		16,166	100.00	
Total rejected ballots		133		
Unreturned ballots		17		
Turnout		16,316	76.47	▲5.21
Registered electors		21,336		
Majority		3,969	24.55	▲22.33
PN gain from PH		Swing		?

Negeri Sembilan state election, 2023
Party	Candidate	Votes	%	∆%
PH	Tengku Zamrah Tengku Sulaiman	6,054	40.75	▲40.75
PN	Muhammad Ghazali Zainal Abidin	5,725	38.53	▲38.53
Independent	Mohamad Rafie Abdul Malek	3,079	20.72	▲20.72
Total valid votes		14,858	100.00	
Total rejected ballots		79		
Unreturned ballots		26		
Turnout		14,963	71.26	▼13.87
Registered electors		20,992		
Majority		329	2.22	▼8.00
PH hold		Swing		

Negeri Sembilan state election, 2018
Party	Candidate	Votes	%	∆%
PKR	Mohamad Rafie Abdul Malek	6,801	51.12	▲1.43
BN	Abu Ubaidah Redza	5,441	40.90	▼9.41
PAS	Mustaffa Daharun	1,061	7.98	▲7.98
Total valid votes		13,303	100.00	
Total rejected ballots		166		
Unreturned ballots		52		
Turnout		13,443	85.13	▼0.66
Registered electors		15,791		
Majority		1,360	10.22	▲9.60
PKR gain from BN		Swing		?

Negeri Sembilan state election, 2013
Party	Candidate	Votes	%	∆%
BN	Abu Ubaidah Redza	7,190	50.31	▲1.05
PKR	Kamarul Baharin Abbas	7,101	49.69	▼1.05
Total valid votes		14,291	100.00	
Total rejected ballots		187		
Unreturned ballots		50		
Turnout		14,528	85.79	▲0.69
Registered electors		16,935		
Majority		89	0.62	▼0.86
BN gain from PKR		Swing		?

Negeri Sembilan state election, 2008
Party	Candidate	Votes	%	∆%
PKR	Rashid Latiff	5,679	50.74	▲19.61
BN	Mohd Nor Awang	5,514	49.26	▼19.61
Total valid votes		11,193	100.00	
Total rejected ballots		236		
Unreturned ballots		29		
Turnout		11,458	74.96	▲2.96
Registered electors		15,286		
Majority		165	1.47	▼36.27
PKR gain from BN		Swing		?

Negeri Sembilan state election, 2004
Party	Candidate	Votes	%	∆%
BN	Zakaria Nordin	7,418	68.87	▲11.69
PKR	Mohamad Rafie Ab Malek	3,353	31.13	▲31.13
Total valid votes		10,771	100.00	
Total rejected ballots		219		
Unreturned ballots		19		
Turnout		11,009	72.00	▼3.30
Registered electors		15,290		
Majority		4,065	37.74	▲22.74
BN hold		Swing		

Negeri Sembilan state election, 1999
Party	Candidate	Votes	%	∆%
BN	Zakaria Nordin	7,398	57.18	▼25.33
PAS	Ibrahim Abd. Rahman	5,458	42.19	▲24.70
Independent	Mohammad Abdullah	81	0.63	▲0.63
Total valid votes		12,937	100.00	
Total rejected ballots		297		
Unreturned ballots		205		
Turnout		13,439	75.30	▲1.32
Registered electors		17,847		
Majority		1,940	15.00	▼50.03
BN hold		Swing		

Negeri Sembilan state election, 1995
Party	Candidate	Votes	%	∆%
BN	Dermata'siah binti Abdul Jalil	9,561	82.51	▲21.78
PAS	Ghazalli Abdul Kadir	2,026	17.49	▲17.49
Total valid votes		11,587	100.00	
Total rejected ballots		389		
Unreturned ballots		212		
Turnout		12,188	73.98	▼0.93
Registered electors		16,475		
Majority		7,535	65.03	▲43.55
BN hold		Swing		

Negeri Sembilan state election, 1990
Party	Candidate	Votes	%	∆%
BN	Dermata'siah binti Abdul Jalil	7,344	60.74	▲3.12
S46	Harun Ayat	4,747	39.26	▲39.26
Total valid votes		12,091	100.00	
Total rejected ballots		369		
Unreturned ballots		200		
Turnout		12,660	74.91	▲4.83
Registered electors		16,900		
Majority		2,597	21.48	▼6.23
BN hold		Swing		

Negeri Sembilan state election, 1986
Party	Candidate	Votes	%
BN	Khatimah binti Ibrahim	5,089	57.62
DAP	Abd. Malek Aman	2,642	29.91
PAS	Mohamad Mangsor Keliwan	1,101	12.47
Total valid votes		8,832	100.00
Total rejected ballots		227	
Unreturned ballots		0	
Turnout		9,059	70.08
Registered electors		12,927	
Majority		2,447	27.71
This was a new seat created.
