= Nilai (state constituency) =

Political subdivision in Malaysia

Nilai (N10)
Negeri Sembilan constituency

State constituency
- Legislature: Negeri Sembilan State Legislative Assembly
MLA
Arul Kumar Jambunathan
PH
- Constituency created: 1995
- First contested: 1995
- Last contested: 2026

Demographics
- Electors (2023): 42,168

N10 Nilai within Negeri Sembilan, as used for the 2023 and 2026 state elections

Nilai is a state constituency in Negeri Sembilan, Malaysia, that has been represented in the Negeri Sembilan.

The state constituency was first contested in 1995 and is mandated to return a single Assemblyman to the Negeri Sembilan State Legislative Assembly under the first-past-the-post voting system.

== Demographics ==
Ethnic breakdown of Nilai's electorate as of 2026
1. Malay (46.4%)
2. Chinese (30.0%)
3. Indian (20.8%)
4. Other ethnicities (2.90%)

== History ==
=== Polling districts ===
According to the federal gazette issued on 23 July 2026, the Nilai constituency is divided into 10 polling districts.

State constituency	Polling district	Code	Location
Nilai (N10)	Nilai	128/10/01	SMK Dato' Mohd Said; SJK (C) Kuo Min Nilai
Nilai (N10)	Batang Benar	128/10/02	SK Batang Benar
Nilai (N10)	Pekan Pajam	128/10/03	SJK (C) Kg Baru Pajam
Nilai (N10)	Kampung Gebok	128/10/04	Balai Raya Kampung Gebok Pajam; Tabika Kemas Kampung Gebok
Nilai (N10)	Batu Sebelas	128/10/05	SK Mantin
Nilai (N10)	Kampong Bahru Mantin	128/10/06	Dewan Orang Ramai Kampung Baru Mantin
Nilai (N10)	Pekan Mantin	128/10/07	SMK Mantin; SJK (C) Chung Hua Mantin
Nilai (N10)	Kg Attap	128/10/08	SJK (C) Chi Chi Mantin; Dewan Komuniti Mantin
Nilai (N10)	Mantin Dalam	128/10/09	SJK (T) Ladang Cairo
Nilai (N10)	Bandar Baru Nilai	128/10/10	SMK Taman Semarak; SK Taman Semarak; SJK (C) Putra Nilai; SK Desa Jasmin; SK Nilai Impian

=== Representation history ===
Members of Assembly for Nilai
Assembly	No	Years	Name	Party
Constituency created from Lenggeng
9th	N18	1995-1999	Peter Lai Yit Fee (赖日辉)	BN (MCA)
10th	N18	1999-2004	Peter Lai Yit Fee (赖日辉)	BN (MCA)
11th	N10	2004-2008	Peter Lai Yit Fee (赖日辉)	BN (MCA)
12th	N10	2008-2013	Yap Yew Weng (叶耀荣)	PR (DAP)
13th	N10	2013-2015	Arul Kumar Jambunathan (அருள் குமார் ஜம்புநாதன்)	PR (DAP)
13th	N10	2015-2018	Arul Kumar Jambunathan (அருள் குமார் ஜம்புநாதன்)	PH (DAP)
14th	N10	2018-2023	Arul Kumar Jambunathan (அருள் குமார் ஜம்புநாதன்)	PH (DAP)
15th	N10	2023–2026	Arul Kumar Jambunathan (அருள் குமார் ஜம்புநாதன்)	PH (DAP)
16th	N10	2026–present	Arul Kumar Jambunathan (அருள் குமார் ஜம்புநாதன்)	PH (DAP)

== Election results ==
Negeri Sembilan state election, 2026
Party	Candidate	Votes	%	∆%
PH	Arul Kumar Jambunathan	15,797	48.78	▼17.51
BN	Lai Chien Kong	9,860	30.45	▲30.45
Pan-Malaysian Islamic Front	Zamani Ibrahim	5,844	18.04	▲18.04
BERSATU	V Saravan Kumar Veerasamy	718	2.22	▲2.22
Independent	Omar Mohd Isa	167	0.52	▼4.43
Total valid votes		32,386	100.00	
Total rejected ballots		345		
Unreturned ballots		22		
Turnout		32,753	71.34	▲2.35
Registered electors		45,911		
Majority		5,937	18.33	▼19.40
PH hold		Swing		

Negeri Sembilan state election, 2023
Party	Candidate	Votes	%	∆%
PH	Arul Kumar Jambunathan	19,133	66.29	▲66.29
PN	Gan Chee Biow	8,244	28.56	▲28.56
Independent	Omar Mohd Isa	1,430	4.95	▲4.95
Independent	Yessu Samuel	57	0.20	▲0.20
Total valid votes		28,864	100.00	
Total rejected ballots		203		
Unreturned ballots		24		
Turnout		29,091	68.99	▼16.28
Registered electors		42,168		
Majority		10,889	37.73	▼9.59
PH hold		Swing		

Negeri Sembilan state election, 2018
Party	Candidate	Votes	%	∆%
PKR	Arul Kumar Jambunathan	14,219	68.48	▲68.48
BN	Leaw Kok Chan	4,394	21.16	▼15.55
PAS	Mohd Abu Zahrim Abd Rahman	2,151	10.36	▲10.36
Total valid votes		20,764	100.00	
Total rejected ballots		208		
Unreturned ballots		53		
Turnout		21,025	85.27	▼0.04
Registered electors		24,657		
Majority		9,825	47.32	▲23.85
PKR hold		Swing		

Negeri Sembilan state election, 2013
Party	Candidate	Votes	%	∆%
DAP	Arul Kumar Jambunathan	10,378	60.18	▲2.03
BN	Gan Chee Biow	6,331	36.71	▼5.14
Independent	Ahmad Kamarulzaman Abu	490	2.84	▲2.84
Independent	Rajashegher Sithambam	47	0.27	▲0.27
Total valid votes		17,246	100.00	
Total rejected ballots		327		
Unreturned ballots		26		
Turnout		17,599	85.31	▲10.92
Registered electors		20,629		
Majority		4,047	23.47	▲7.17
DAP hold		Swing		

Negeri Sembilan state election, 2008
Party	Candidate	Votes	%	∆%
DAP	Yap Yew Weng	6,755	58.15	▲21.75
BN	Peter Lai Yit Fee	4,861	41.85	▼21.75
Total valid votes		11,616	100.00	
Total rejected ballots		275		
Unreturned ballots		18		
Turnout		11,909	74.39	▲3.68
Registered electors		16,009		
Majority		1,894	16.31	▼10.90
DAP gain from BN		Swing		?

Negeri Sembilan state election, 2004
Party	Candidate	Votes	%	∆%
BN	Lai Yit Fee	6,451	63.60	▼0.10
DAP	Lew Kwee Leong	3,692	36.40	▲0.10
Total valid votes		10,143	100.00	
Total rejected ballots		321		
Unreturned ballots		2		
Turnout		10,466	70.71	▼2.14
Registered electors		14,802		
Majority		2,759	27.20	▼0.19
BN hold		Swing		

Negeri Sembilan state election, 1999
Party	Candidate	Votes	%	∆%
BN	Lai Yit Fee	6,032	63.70	▼4.79
DAP	Wong Swee Ching	3,438	36.30	▲4.79
Total valid votes		9,470	100.00	
Total rejected ballots		292		
Unreturned ballots		21		
Turnout		9,783	72.85	▼2.44
Registered electors		13,429		
Majority		2,594	27.39	▼9.59
BN hold		Swing		

Negeri Sembilan state election, 1995
Party	Candidate	Votes	%
BN	Lai Yit Fee	6,336	68.49
DAP	Wong Zee Nyok	2,915	31.51
Total valid votes		9,251	100.00
Total rejected ballots		261	
Unreturned ballots		26	
Turnout		9,538	75.29
Registered electors		12,668	
Majority		3,421	36.98
This was a new constituency created.
