= Jeram Padang =

Jeram Padang (N07)
Negeri Sembilan constituency

State constituency
- Legislature: Negeri Sembilan State Legislative Assembly
MLA
Mohd Zaidy Abdul Kadir
BN
- Constituency created: 2003
- First contested: 2004
- Last contested: 2026

Demographics
- Electors (2023): 16,332

N07 Jeram Padang within Negeri Sembilan, as used for the 2023 and 2026 state elections

Jeram Padang is a state constituency in Jempol, Negeri Sembilan, Malaysia. Jeram Padang is currently represented in the Negeri Sembilan State Legislative Assembly.

The state constituency was first contested in 2004 and is mandated to return a single Assemblyman to the Negeri Sembilan State Legislative Assembly under the first-past-the-post voting system.

== Demographics ==
Ethnic breakdown of Jeram Padang's electorate as of 2026
1. Malay (52.3%)
2. Indians (33.2%)
3. Chinese (9.30%)
4. Other ethnicities (5.20%)

== History ==
=== Polling districts ===
According to the gazette issued on 23 July 2026, the Jeram Padang constituency has a total of 10 polling districts.

State constituency	Polling districts	Code	Location
Jeram Padang (N07)	Ladang Bahau	127/07/01	SJK (T) Ldg Bahau
Jeram Padang (N07)	Taman Jaya	127/07/02	SJK (T) Ladang St Helier; SJK (C) Middleton
Jeram Padang (N07)	Bukit Rokan Barat	127/07/03	SK Bukit Rokan Barat
Jeram Padang (N07)	Jeram Padang	127/07/04	SJK (T) Ldg Sialang
Jeram Padang (N07)	Ladang Middleton	127/07/05	SJK (T) Ldg Middleton
Jeram Padang (N07)	Ladang Klepin	127/07/06	SJK (T) Ldg Klepin
Jeram Padang (N07)	Ladang Bukit Pilah	127/07/07	SK Rompin
Jeram Padang (N07)	Rompin	127/07/08	Dewan New Rompin
Jeram Padang (N07)	Palong 2	127/07/09	SK (FELDA) Palong 2
Jeram Padang (N07)	Palong 1	127/07/10	SK (FELDA) Palong 1

=== Representation history ===
Members of State Assembly for Jeram Padang
Assembly	No	Years	Member	Party
Constituency created from Batu Kikir and Palong
11th	N07	2004-2008	Krishnan Letchumanan	BN (MIC)
12th	N07	2008-2013	Mogan Velayatham	BN (MIC)
13th	N07	2013-2018	Manickam Letchuman	BN (MIC)
14th	N07	2018-2023	Manickam Letchuman	BN (MIC)
15th	N07	2023–2026	Mohd Zaidy Abdul Kadir	BN (UMNO)
16th	N07	2026–present	Mohd Zaidy Abdul Kadir	BN (UMNO)

== Election results ==
Negeri Sembilan state election, 2026: Jeram Padang
Party	Candidate	Votes	%	∆%
BN	Mohd Zaidy Abdul Kadir	6,854	59.11	▲5.72
PH	Manivannan Gowindasamy	2,372	20.46	▲20.46
BERSATU	Sri Sanjeevan Ramakrishnan	2,191	18.89	▲18.89
ASLI	Dayana Dal	179	1.54	▲1.54
Total valid votes		11,569	100.00	
Total rejected ballots		266		
Unreturned ballots		7		
Turnout		11,869	71.54	▲8.12
Registered electors		16,590		
Majority		4,482	38.65	▲31.87
BN hold		Swing		

Negeri Sembilan state election, 2023: Jeram Padang
Party	Candidate	Votes	%	∆%
BN	Mohd Zaidy Abdul Kadir	5,462	53.39	▲14.13
PN	Surash Sreenivasan	4,769	46.61	▲46.61
Total valid votes		10,231	100.00	
Total rejected ballots		115		
Unreturned ballots		12		
Turnout		10,358	63.42	▼16.38
Registered electors		16,332		
Majority		693	6.78	▼4.48
BN hold		Swing		

Negeri Sembilan state election, 2018: Jeram Padang
Party	Candidate	Votes	%	∆%
BN	Manickam Letchuman	3,702	39.26	▼24.42
Independent	Surash Sreenivasan	2,640	28.00	▲28.00
PKR	S Musliadi Sabtu	2,302	24.41	▼9.15
PAS	Mohd Fairuz Mohd Isa	785	8.33	▲8.33
Total valid votes		9,429	100.00	
Total rejected ballots		391		
Unreturned ballots		0		
Turnout		9,844	79.80	▼1.23
Registered electors		12,337		
Majority		1,062	11.26	▼18.86
BN hold		Swing		

Negeri Sembilan state election, 2013: Jeram Padang
Party	Candidate	Votes	%	∆%
BN	Manickam Letchuman	5,690	63.68	▼0.10
PKR	Kumar A/L Thuraisingham	2,999	33.56	▼2.66
Independent	Zailani bin Zakaria	201	2.25	▲2.25
Independent	Mazavan A/L A Raman Nair	45	0.54	▲0.54
Total valid votes		8,935	100.00	
Total rejected ballots		250		
Unreturned ballots		0		
Turnout		9,185	81.03	▲12.31
Registered electors		11,336		
Majority		2,691	30.12	▲2.56
BN hold		Swing		

Negeri Sembilan state election, 2008: Jeram Padang
Party	Candidate	Votes	%	∆%
BN	V Mogan	4,185	63.78	▼20.47
PKR	K Manoharan	2,377	36.22	▲20.47
Total valid votes		6,562	100.00	
Total rejected ballots		283		
Unreturned ballots		0		
Turnout		9,844	68.72	▲3.29
Registered electors		9,960		
Majority		1,808	27.56	▼40.94
BN hold		Swing		

Negeri Sembilan state election, 2004: Jeram Padang
Party	Candidate	Votes	%
BN	Dr L Krishnan	5,023	84.25
PKR	S Raja Gopal	939	15.75
Total valid votes		5,962	100.00
Total rejected ballots		302	
Unreturned ballots		0	
Turnout		6,264	65.43
Registered electors		9,573	
Majority		4,084	68.50
This was a new constituency created.
