= Labu (state constituency) =

Political subdivision in Malaysia

Labu (N20)
Negeri Sembilan constituency

State constituency
- Legislature: Negeri Sembilan State Legislative Assembly
MLA
Siti Nur Umaira Hasim
BN
- Constituency created: 1959
- First contested: 1959
- Last contested: 2026

Demographics
- Electors (2023): 30,478

N20 Labu within Negeri Sembilan, as used for the 2023 and 2026 state elections

Labu is a state constituency in Negeri Sembilan, Malaysia, that has been represented in the Negeri Sembilan State Legislative Assembly. It has been represented by Leader of the Opposition Mohamad Hanifah Abu Baker since 2023.

The state constituency was first contested in 1959 and is mandated to return a single Assemblyman to the Negeri Sembilan State Legislative Assembly under the first-past-the-post voting system.

== Demographics ==
Ethnic breakdown of Labu's electorate as of 2026
1. Malay (76.2%)
2. Indian (13.3%)
3. Chinese (7.40%)
4. Other ethnicities (3.10%)

== History ==
=== Polling districts ===
According to the federal gazette issued on 23 July 2026, the Labu constituency is divided into 6 polling districts.

State constituency	Polling district	Code	Location
Labu (N20)	Jijan	130/20/01	SJK (T) Ladang Kubang; SK Desa Cempaka; SJK (T) Desa Cempaka; SK Kompleks KLIA; SMK Bandar Enstek; SMK Kompleks KLIA
Labu (N20)	Kampung Kondok	130/20/02	SK Dato' Ahmad Syah Bandar Abu Bakar Labu Hilir
Labu (N20)	Tiroi	130/20/03	SJK (C) Kampung Baru Batu 8 Labu; SK Labu Ulu
Labu (N20)	Labu	130/20/04	SK Labu; SJK (C) Min Shing
Labu (N20)	Labu Jaya	130/20/05	SK L.B Johnson Seremban
Labu (N20)	Kampong Gadong Jaya	130/20/06	SK Gadong Jaya Labu

=== Representation history ===
Members of the Legislative Assembly for Labu
Assembly	No	Years	Name	Party
Constituency created
1st	N23	1959-1964	S. Sathappan	Socialist Front (Lab)
2nd	N23	1964-1969	Ahmad Abd. Manap	Alliance (UMNO)
		1969-1971	Assembly dissolved	
3rd	N23	1971-1974	Salleh Kassim	Alliance (UMNO)
3rd	N23	1973-1974	Salleh Kassim	BN (UMNO)
4th	N07	1974-1978	Shahardin Hashim	BN (UMNO)
5th	N07	1978-1982	Shahardin Hashim	BN (UMNO)
6th	N07	1982-1986	Shahardin Hashim	BN (UMNO)
7th	N21	1986-1990	Shahardin Hashim	BN (UMNO)
8th	N21	1990-1995	Shahardin Hashim	BN (UMNO)
9th	N23	1995-1999	Muhamad Sahlan Shaid	BN (UMNO)
10th	N23	1999-2004	Muhamad Sahlan Shaid	BN (UMNO)
11th	N20	2004-2008	Muhamad Sahlan Shaid	BN (UMNO)
12th	N20	2008-2013	Hasim Rusdi	BN (UMNO)
13th	N20	2013-2018	Hasim Rusdi	BN (UMNO)
14th	N20	2018-2023	Ismail Ahmad	PH (PKR)
15th	N20	2023–2026	Mohamad Hanifah Abu Baker	PN (BERSATU)
16th	N20	2026–present	Siti Nur Umaira Hashim	BN (UMNO)

== Election results ==
Negeri Sembilan state election, 2026
Party	Candidate	Votes	%	∆%
BN	Siti Nur Umaira Hasim	14,209	56.56	▲56.56
PH	Ahmad Faez Abdul Razak	8,930	35.54	▼10.68
BERSATU	Mohamad Hanifah Abu Baker	1,985	7.90	▲7.90
Total valid votes		25,124	100.00	
Total rejected ballots		237		
Unreturned ballots		18		
Turnout		25,379	77.18	▲5.41
Registered electors		32,884		
Majority		5,279	21.01	▲13.45
BN gain from PN		Swing		?

Negeri Sembilan state election, 2023
Party	Candidate	Votes	%	∆%
PN	Mohamad Hanifah Abu Baker	11,661	53.78	▲53.78
PH	Ismail Ahmad	10,021	46.22	▲46.22
Total valid votes		21,682	100.00	
Total rejected ballots		159		
Unreturned ballots		32		
Turnout		21,873	71.77	▼12.50
Registered electors		30,478		
Majority		1,640	7.56	▲1.55
PN gain from PKR		Swing		?

Negeri Sembilan state election, 2018
Party	Candidate	Votes	%	∆%
PKR	Ismail Ahmad	6,712	45.72	▲45.72
BN	Hasim Rusdi	5,830	39.71	▼16.26
PAS	Khairil Anuar Mohd Wafa	2,093	14.26	▼29.77
People's Alternative Party	David Dass Aseerpatham	46	0.31	▲0.31
Total valid votes		14,681	100.00	
Total rejected ballots		266		
Unreturned ballots		59		
Turnout		15,006	84.27	▼1.26
Registered electors		17,808		
Majority		882	6.01	▼5.93
PKR gain from BN		Swing		?

Negeri Sembilan state election, 2013
Party	Candidate	Votes	%	∆%
BN	Hasim Rusdi	7,082	55.97	▼1.43
PAS	Khairil Anuar Mohd Wafa	5,571	44.03	▲44.03
Total valid votes		12,653	100.00	
Total rejected ballots		263		
Unreturned ballots		48		
Turnout		12,964	85.53	▲7.58
Registered electors		15,158		
Majority		1,511	11.94	▼2.86
BN hold		Swing		

Negeri Sembilan state election, 2008
Party	Candidate	Votes	%	∆%
BN	Hasim Rusdi	5,451	57.40	▼8.26
PKR	Mokhtar Ahmad	4,046	42.60	▲42.60
Total valid votes		9,497	100.00	
Total rejected ballots		204		
Unreturned ballots		1		
Turnout		9,702	77.76	▲3.96
Registered electors		12,477		
Majority		1,405	14.79	▼16.52
BN hold		Swing		

Negeri Sembilan state election, 2004
Party	Candidate	Votes	%	∆%
BN	Muhamad Shahlan Shaid	5,605	65.66	▲3.83
PAS	Syed Mohd Fuad Syed Ahmad	2,932	34.34	▲34.34
Total valid votes		8,537	100.00	
Total rejected ballots		230		
Unreturned ballots		245		
Turnout		9,012	73.80	▲0.04
Registered electors		12,212		
Majority		2,673	31.31	▲7.65
BN hold		Swing		

Negeri Sembilan state election, 1999
Party	Candidate	Votes	%	∆%
BN	Muhamad Shahlan Shaid	4,401	61.83	▼25.24
PAS	Norizam Yasin	2,717	38.17	▲38.17
Total valid votes		7,118	100.00	
Total rejected ballots		240		
Unreturned ballots		6		
Turnout		7,364	73.76	▼0.40
Registered electors		9,984		
Majority		1,684	23.66	▼50.49
BN hold		Swing		

Negeri Sembilan state election, 1995
Party	Candidate	Votes	%	∆%
BN	Muhamad Shahlan Shaid	6,075	87.07	▲17.60
S46	Othman Abdullah	902	12.93	▼17.60
Total valid votes		6,977	100.00	
Total rejected ballots		238		
Unreturned ballots		5		
Turnout		7,220	74.16	▼3.01
Registered electors		9,736		
Majority		5,173	74.14	▲35.20
BN hold		Swing		

Negeri Sembilan state election, 1990
Party	Candidate	Votes	%	∆%
BN	Shahardin Hashim	6,096	69.47	▼8.07
S46	Harun Selatan	2,679	30.53	▲30.53
Total valid votes		8,775	100.00	
Total rejected ballots		314		
Unreturned ballots		2		
Turnout		9,091	77.17	▲3.19
Registered electors		11,781		
Majority		3,417	38.94	▼16.15
BN hold		Swing		

Negeri Sembilan state election, 1986
Party	Candidate	Votes	%	∆%
BN	Shahardin Hashim	5,615	77.54	▼6.22
DAP	Yap Sin Kin	1,626	22.46	▲6.22
Total valid votes		7,241	100.00	
Total rejected ballots		291		
Unreturned ballots		0		
Turnout		7,532	73.98	▼3.90
Registered electors		10,181		
Majority		3,989	55.09	▼12.43
BN hold		Swing		

Negeri Sembilan state election, 1982
Party	Candidate	Votes	%	∆%
BN	Shahardin Hashim	6,834	83.76	▲4.05
DAP	Othman Md. Atas	1,325	16.24	▼4.05
Total valid votes		8,159	100.00	
Total rejected ballots		210		
Unreturned ballots		0		
Turnout		8,369	77.88	▼1.44
Registered electors		10,746		
Majority		5,509	67.52	▲8.11
BN hold		Swing		

Negeri Sembilan state election, 1978
Party	Candidate	Votes	%	∆%
BN	Shahardin Hashim	5,538	79.71	▲10.04
DAP	Nasaruddin Abd. Latiff	1,410	20.29	▲12.59
Total valid votes		6,948	100.00	
Total rejected ballots		349		
Unreturned ballots		0		
Turnout		7,297	79.32	▼0.97
Registered electors		9,199		
Majority		4,128	59.41	▲3.51
BN hold		Swing		

Negeri Sembilan state election, 1974
Party	Candidate	Votes	%	∆%
BN	Shahardin Hashim	4,090	69.66	▲25.71
Parti Sosialis Rakyat Malaysia	Mohd. Nor Md. Salleh	808	13.76	▲13.76
DAP	Kuppusamy Maruthy	452	7.70	▼28.61
Independent	Chen Hun Chong	323	5.50	▲0.76
PEKEMAS	Ahmad Mansor	198	3.37	▲3.37
Total valid votes		5,871	100.00	
Total rejected ballots		446		
Unreturned ballots		0		
Turnout		6,317	80.30	▲4.65
Registered electors		7,867		
Majority		3,282	55.90	▲48.26
BN gain from Alliance		Swing		-

Negeri Sembilan state election, 1969
Party	Candidate	Votes	%	∆%
Alliance	Ahmad Abdul Manaf	2,093	43.95	▼14.28
DAP	Ponnusamy Ramakrishnan	1,729	36.31	▲36.31
Parti Sosialis Rakyat Malaysia	Salleh Kassim	586	12.31	▲12.31
Independent	Parameswaran	226	4.75	▼0.05
PCMB	Chen Ah Lek	128	2.69	▲2.69
Total valid votes		4,762	100.00	
Total rejected ballots		528		
Unreturned ballots		0		
Turnout		5,290	75.65	▼2.82
Registered electors		6,993		
Majority		364	7.64	▼13.62
Alliance hold		Swing		

Negeri Sembilan state election, 1964
Party	Candidate	Votes	%	∆%
Alliance	Ahmad Abdul Manaf	2,791	58.23	▲28.16
Socialist Front	Gurnam Singh Gill	1,772	36.97	▼19.02
Independent	Abdul Razak Shamsuddin	230	4.80	▲3.11
Total valid votes		4,793	100.00	
Total rejected ballots		192		
Unreturned ballots		0		
Turnout		4,985	78.47	▼6.49
Registered electors		6,353		
Majority		1,019	21.26	▼4.66
Alliance gain from Socialist Front		Swing		-

Negeri Sembilan state election, 1959
Party	Candidate	Votes	%
Socialist Front	Sathappan Sathappan	1,888	55.99
Alliance	Mohd. Yusof Lateh	1,014	30.07
PMIP	Othman Md. Atas	413	12.25
Independent	Abdul Jalil Osman	57	1.69
Total valid votes		3,372	100.00
Total rejected ballots		83	
Unreturned ballots		0	
Turnout		3,455	84.95
Registered electors		4,067	
Majority		874	25.92
This was a new constituency created.
