= Ismail Ahmad =

Malaysian politician

Yang Berbahagia Dato' Ismail Ahmad DPNS
- إسماعيل بن أحمد

Member of the Negeri Sembilan State Executive Council (Rural Development)
- In office 23 May 2018 – 14 August 2023
- Monarch: Muhriz
- Menteri Besar: Aminuddin Harun
- Preceded by: Mohamad Hasan (Menteri Besar)
- Succeeded by: Jalaluddin Alias (Senior Member)
- Constituency: Labu

Member of the Negeri Sembilan State Legislative Assembly for Labu
- In office 9 May 2018 – 12 August 2023
- Preceded by: Hasim Rusdi (BN–UMNO)
- Succeeded by: Mohamad Hanifah Abu Baker (PN–BERSATU)
- Majority: 882 (2018)

Personal details
- Born: Ismail bin Ahmad; 18 July 1956 (age 69) Johor, Federation of Malaya (now Malaysia)
- Party: People's Justice Party (PKR)
- Other political affiliations: Pakatan Harapan (PH)
- Spouse: Selamah Sulaiman
- Education: University of Georgia
- Occupation: Politician

Ismail bin Ahmad (born 18 July 1956) is a Malaysian politician who served as Member of the Negeri Sembilan State Executive Council (EXCO) in the Pakatan Harapan (PH) state administration under Menteri Besar Aminuddin Harun and Member of the Negeri Sembilan State Legislative Assembly (MLA) for Labu from May 2018 to August 2023. He is a member of the People's Justice Party (PKR), a component party of the PH coalition.

== Election results ==
Negeri Sembilan State Legislative Assembly
Year	Constituency	Candidate	Votes	Pct	Opponent(s)	Votes	Pct	Ballots cast	Majority	Turnout%
2018	N20 Labu	Ismail Ahmad (PKR)	6,712	45.72%	Hasim Rusdi (UMNO)	5,830	39.71%	15,006	882	84.30%
2018	N20 Labu	Ismail Ahmad (PKR)	6,712	45.72%	Mohd Khairil Anuar Mohd Wafa (PAS)	2,093	14.26%	15,006	882	84.30%
2018	N20 Labu	Ismail Ahmad (PKR)	6,712	45.72%	David Dass Aseerpatham (PAP)	46	0.31%	15,006	882	84.30%
2023	N20 Labu	Ismail Ahmad (PKR)	10,021	46.22%	Mohamad Hanifah Abu Baker (BERSATU)	11,661	53.78%	21,841	1,640	71.66%

== Honours ==
- Negeri Sembilan
  - Knight Commander of the Order of Loyalty to Negeri Sembilan (DPNS) – Dato' (2021)
