= Abu Ubaidah Redza =

Malaysian politician

Yang Berbahagia Dato' Abu Ubaidah Redza DPNS
- أبو عبيدة رضا

Member of the Negeri Sembilan State Executive Council
- In office 22 May 2013 – 12 May 2018 (Public Utilities, Environment, Cooperatives and Consumerism)
- Monarch: Muhriz
- Menteri Besar: Mohamad Hasan
- Preceded by: Mogan Velayatham
- Succeeded by: Veerapan Superamaniam (Environment, Cooperatives and Consumerism)
- Constituency: Ampangan

Member of the Negeri Sembilan State Legislative Assembly for Ampangan
- In office 5 May 2013 – 9 May 2018
- Preceded by: Rashid Latiff (PR–PKR)
- Succeeded by: Mohamad Rafie Abdul Malek (PH–PKR)
- Majority: 89 (2013)

Personal details
- Born: Negeri Sembilan, Malaysia
- Citizenship: Malaysian
- Party: United Malays National Organisation (UMNO)
- Other political affiliations: Barisan Nasional (BN)
- Education: University of Malaya
- Occupation: Politician
- Abu Ubaidah Redza on Facebook

Abu Ubaidah bin Redza is a Malaysian politician who served as Negeri Sembilan State Executive Councillor.

== Election results ==
Negeri Sembilan State Legislative Assembly
Year	Constituency	Candidate	Votes	Pct	Opponent(s)	Votes	Pct	Ballots cast	Majority	Turnout
2013	N14 Ampangan	Abu Ubaidah Redza (UMNO)	7,190	50.31%	Kamarul Baharin Abbas (PKR)	7,101	49.69%	14,525	89	85.80%
2018	N14 Ampangan	Abu Ubaidah Redza (UMNO)	5,441	39.71%	Mohamad Rafie Abdul Malek (PKR)	6,801	51.39%	13,443	1,360	85.10%
2018	N14 Ampangan	Abu Ubaidah Redza (UMNO)	5,441	39.71%	Mustaffa Daharun (PAS)	983	8.90%	13,443	1,360	85.10%

== Honours ==
- Negeri Sembilan
  - Knight Commander of the Order of Loyalty to Negeri Sembilan (DPNS) – Dato' (2014)
