= Mambau (state constituency) =

Political subdivision in Malaysia

Mambau (N23)
Negeri Sembilan constituency

State constituency
- Legislature: Negeri Sembilan State Legislative Assembly
MLA
Lee Kai Yet
PH
- Constituency created: 1984
- First contested: 1986
- Last contested: 2026

Demographics
- Electors (2023): 28,952

N23 Mambau within Negeri Sembilan, as used for the 2023 and 2026 state elections

Mambau is a state constituency in Negeri Sembilan, Malaysia, that has been represented in the Negeri Sembilan State Legislative Assembly.

The state constituency was first contested in 1986 and is mandated to return a single Assemblyman to the Negeri Sembilan State Legislative Assembly under the first-past-the-post voting system.

== Demographics ==
Ethnic breakdown of Mambau's electorate as of 2026
1. Chinese (58.7%)
2. Indian (25.6%)
3. Malay (13.7%)
4. Other ethnicities (1.90%)

== History ==
=== Polling districts ===
According to the federal gazette issued on 23 July 2026, the Mambau constituency is divided into 5 polling districts.

State constituency	Polling district	Code	Location
Mambau (N23)	Desa Seri Mambau	130/23/01	Balai Raya Kampung Batu 3 Mambau; SJK (C) Kg Baru Mambau
Mambau (N23)	Taman Sungai Ujong	130/23/02	SMK Seremban 3
Mambau (N23)	Pekan Mambau	130/23/03	Balai Raya Kg. Sri Mantau
Mambau (N23)	Rasah Jaya	130/23/04	SK Taman Rasah Jaya; UITM Cawangan Negeri Sembilan
Mambau (N23)	Bukit Blossom	130/23/05	SJK (C) Sin Hua; SJK (C) Kelpin

=== Representation history ===
Members of the Legislative Assembly for Mambau
Assembly	No	Years	Name	Party
Constituency created from Rasah, Labu, Rahang and Rantau
7th	N22	1986-1990	Hu Sepang (胡雪邦)	DAP
8th	N22	1990-1995	Chan Kok Wah (陈国华)	DAP
9th	N26	1995-1999	Lee Chee Keong (李志強)	BN (MCA)
10th	N26	1999-2004	Yu Chok Tow (尤绰韬)	BN (MCA)
11th	N23	2004-2008	Yu Chok Tow (尤绰韬)	BN (MCA)
12th	N23	2008-2013	Wong May May (黃美美)	PR (DAP)
13th	N23	2013-2018	Yap Yew Weng (叶耀荣)	PR (DAP)
14th	N23	2018-2023	Yap Yew Weng (叶耀荣)	PH (DAP)
15th	N23	2023–2026	Yap Yew Weng (叶耀荣)	PH (DAP)
16th	N23	2026–present	Lee Kai Yet (李凱业)	PH (DAP)

== Election results ==
Negeri Sembilan state election, 2026
Party	Candidate	Votes	%	∆%
PH	Lee Kai Yet	15,758	78.01	▼10.27
PN	Erik Michael	3,655	18.09	▲8.79
BERSATU	Sarawanan Nagayah	786	3.89	▲3.89
Total valid votes		20,199	100.00	
Total rejected ballots		196		
Unreturned ballots		15		
Turnout		20,410	67.26	▲0.06
Registered electors		30,346		
Majority		12,103	59.92	▼17.48
PH hold		Swing		

Negeri Sembilan state election, 2023
Party	Candidate	Votes	%	∆%
PH	Yap Yew Weng	17,039	88.28	▲3.24
PN	Satesh Kumar Nillamiam	2,099	10.88	▲10.88
Independent	Kumaravel Ramiah	163	0.84	▲0.84
Total valid votes		19,301	100.00	
Total rejected ballots		135		
Unreturned ballots		20		
Turnout		19,456	67.20	▼18.27
Registered electors		28,952		
Majority		14,940	77.40	▲6.74
PH hold		Swing		

Negeri Sembilan state election, 2018
Party	Candidate	Votes	%	∆%
PKR	Yap Yew Weng	14,911	85.04	▲85.04
BN	Hoi Choi Sin	2,522	14.38	▼9.07
People's Alternative Party	T. Parimala Devi	101	0.58	▲0.58
Total valid votes		17,534	100.00	
Total rejected ballots		156		
Unreturned ballots		62		
Turnout		17,752	85.47	▼1.75
Registered electors		20,771		
Majority		12,389	70.66	▲17.56
PKR hold		Swing		

Negeri Sembilan state election, 2013
Party	Candidate	Votes	%	∆%
DAP	Yap Yew Weng	13,518	76.55	▲3.26
BN	Hoi Choi Sin	4,141	23.45	▼3.26
Total valid votes		17,659	100.00	
Total rejected ballots		204		
Unreturned ballots		52		
Turnout		17,915	87.22	▲5.91
Registered electors		20,541		
Majority		9,377	53.10	▲6.52
DAP hold		Swing		

Negeri Sembilan state election, 2008
Party	Candidate	Votes	%	∆%
DAP	Wong May May	9,580	73.29	▲30.95
BN	Goh Siow Huat	3,491	26.71	▼30.95
Total valid votes		13,071	100.00	
Total rejected ballots		169		
Unreturned ballots		12		
Turnout		13,252	81.31	▲6.69
Registered electors		16,298		
Majority		6,089	46.58	▲31.28
DAP gain from BN		Swing		?

Negeri Sembilan state election, 2004
Party	Candidate	Votes	%	∆%
BN	Yu Chok Tow	5,714	57.65	▲5.94
DAP	Cha Kee Chin	4,197	42.35	▼5.94
Total valid votes		9,911	100.00	
Total rejected ballots		142		
Unreturned ballots		3		
Turnout		10,056	74.62	▼0.95
Registered electors		13,476		
Majority		1,517	15.31	▲11.87
BN hold		Swing		

Negeri Sembilan state election, 1999
Party	Candidate	Votes	%	∆%
BN	Yu Chok Tow	8,133	51.72	▼2.41
DAP	Liew Tet Kim	7,593	48.28	▲2.41
Total valid votes		15,726	100.00	
Total rejected ballots		249		
Unreturned ballots		16		
Turnout		15,991	75.58	▲0.53
Registered electors		21,159		
Majority		540	3.43	▼4.81
BN hold		Swing		

Negeri Sembilan state election, 1995
Party	Candidate	Votes	%	∆%
BN	Lee Chee Keong	7,200	54.12	▲8.28
DAP	Chan Kok Wah	6,103	45.88	▼8.28
Total valid votes		13,303	100.00	
Total rejected ballots		240		
Unreturned ballots		12		
Turnout		13,555	75.05	▲0.43
Registered electors		18,062		
Majority		1,097	8.25	▼0.07
BN gain from DAP		Swing		-

Negeri Sembilan state election, 1990
Party	Candidate	Votes	%	∆%
DAP	Chan Kok Wah	11,137	54.16	▼5.44
BN	Lee Gee Huy (Lee Kong Fee)	9,427	45.84	▲5.44
Total valid votes		20,564	100.00	
Total rejected ballots		613		
Unreturned ballots		160		
Turnout		21,337	74.61	▲1.31
Registered electors		28,597		
Majority		1,710	8.32	▼10.89
DAP hold		Swing		-

Negeri Sembilan state election, 1986
Party	Candidate	Votes	%	∆%
DAP	Hu Sepang	10,056	59.60	
BN	Lee Gee Huy	6,816	40.40	
Total valid votes		16,872	100.00	
Total rejected ballots		359		
Unreturned ballots		0		
Turnout		17,231	73.30	
Registered electors		23,506		
Majority		3,240	19.20	
This was a new constituency created.
