= Telok Kemang (federal constituency) =

Negeri Sembilan constituency

Defunct federal constituency
- Legislature: Dewan Rakyat
- Constituency created: 1974
- Constituency abolished: 2018
- First contested: 1974
- Last contested: 2013

Telok Kemang was a federal constituency in Negeri Sembilan, Malaysia, that was represented in the Dewan Rakyat from 1974 to 2018. It was replaced by Port Dickson parliamentary constituency following the 2018 redelineation exercise.

The federal constituency was created in the 1974 redistribution and was mandated to return a single member to the Dewan Rakyat under the first past the post voting system.

== History ==
It was abolished in 2018 when it was redistributed.

=== Representation history ===
Members of Parliament for Telok Kemang
Parliament	No	Years	Member	Party	Vote Share
Constituency created, renamed from Port Dickson
4th	P093	1974-1978	Pathmanaban Kunjamboo (ஏ. புத்தாநன்பன்)	BN (MIC)	13,996; 66.80%
5th	P093	1978-1982	Pathmanaban Kunjamboo (ஏ. புத்தாநன்பன்)	BN (MIC)	14,521; 56.23%
6th	P093	1982-1986	Pathmanaban Kunjamboo (ஏ. புத்தாநன்பன்)	BN (MIC)	18,937; 65.62%
7th	P109	1986-1990	Pathmanaban Kunjamboo (ஏ. புத்தாநன்பன்)	BN (MIC)	19,193; 74.95%
8th	P109	1990-1995	T. Marimuthu (டி.மரிமுத்து)	BN (MIC)	22,367; 71.56%
9th	P119	1995-1999	L. Krishnan (எல் கிருஷ்ணன்)	BN (MIC)	32,543; 73.84%
10th	P119	1999-2000	S. A. Anpalagan (எஸ் எ அன்பலகன்)	BN (MIC)	26,815; 61.03%
10th	P119	2000-2004	Sothinathan Sinna Goundar (எஸ். சோதிநாதன்)	BN (MIC)	24,500; 56.94%
11th	P132	2004-2008	Sothinathan Sinna Goundar (எஸ். சோதிநாதன்)	BN (MIC)	28,494; 72.67%
12th	P132	2008-2013	Kamarul Bahrin Abbas (قمرالبحرين عباس)	PR (PKR)	23,348; 52.48%
13th	P132	2013-2015	Kamarul Bahrin Abbas (قمرالبحرين عباس)	PR (PKR)	29,848; 51.01%
13th	P132	2015-2018	Kamarul Bahrin Abbas (قمرالبحرين عباس)	PH (PKR)	29,848; 51.01%
Constituency abolished, renamed to Port Dickson

=== State constituency ===
Parliamentary constituency	State constituency						
Parliamentary constituency	1955–59*	1959–1974	1974–1986	1986–1995	1995–2004	2004–2018	2018–present
Telok Kemang						Bagan Pinang	
Telok Kemang				Chembong			
Telok Kemang						Chuah	
Telok Kemang			Jimah				
Telok Kemang			Linggi				
Telok Kemang					Lukut		
Telok Kemang			Pasir Panjang				
Telok Kemang						Port Dickson	
Telok Kemang			Si Rusa				

=== Historical boundaries ===
State Constituency	Area			
State Constituency	1974	1984	1994	2003
Bagan Pinang				Bagan Pinang; Bandar Sunggala; Ladang Sua Betong; Silau; Si Rusa
Chembong		Chembong; Kampung Kundur Tengah; Kampung Orang Asli Ulu Chuai; Pedas; Rembau		
Chuah				Bukit Pelandok; Chuah; Sungai Nipah; Taman Kasawari; Tanah Merah
Jimah	Bukit Pelandok; Chuah; Ladang Salak; Lukut; Tanah Merah			
Linggi	Ayer Kuning; Kampung Kundur Tengah; Kampung Pengkalan Durian; Linggi; Pengkalan Kempas		Ayer Kuning; Kampung Bukit Tembok; Kampung Pengkalan Durian; Linggi; Pengkalan Kempas	Linggi; Pasir Panjang; Pengkalan Kempas; Telok Kemang; Telok Pelanduk
Lukut			Bukit Pelandok; Chuah; Ladang Salak; Lukut; Tanah Merah	Bandar Dataran Segar; Bandar Springhill; Ladang Salak; Lukut; Taman Tun Sambathan
Pasir Panjang	Kampung Segenting; Si Rusa; Pasir Panjang; Telok Kemang; Telok Pelandok		Kampung Tanjung Agas; Si Rusa; Pasir Panjang; Telok Kemang; Telok Pelandok	
Port Dickson				Kampung Gelam; Kampung Paya; Port Dickson; Taman Selasih; Taman Tiong Nam
Si Rusa	Ladang Salak; Ladang Sua Betong; Port Dickson; Si Rusa; Silau			

== Election results ==
Malaysian general election, 2013
Party	Candidate	Votes	%	∆%
PKR	Kamarul Bahrin Abbas	29,848	51.01	▼1.47
BN	Mogan Velayatham	28,269	48.31	▲2.14
Independent	Kamarudin Kumaravel Abdullah	394	0.67	▲0.67
Total valid votes		58,511	100.00	
Total rejected ballots		1,344		
Unreturned ballots		129		
Turnout		59,984	85.05	▲7.60
Registered electors		70,524		
Majority		1,579	2.70	▼3.61
PKR hold		Swing		
Source(s) "Federal Government Gazette - Notice of Contested Election, Parliament for the State of Negeri Sembilan [P.U. (B) 179/2013]" (PDF). Attorney General's Chambers of Malaysia. 26 April 2013. Archived from the original (PDF) on 2019-12-29. "Federal Government Gazette - Results of Contested Election and Statements of the Poll after the Official Addition of Votes, Parliamentary Constituencies for the State of Negeri Sembilan [P.U. (B) 220/2013]" (PDF). Attorney General's Chambers of Malaysia. 22 May 2013.

Malaysian general election, 2008
Party	Candidate	Votes	%	∆%
PKR	Kamarul Bahrin Abbas	23,348	52.48	▲25.15
BN	Sothinathan Sinna Goundar	20,544	46.17	▼26.50
Independent	Mohd Rashid Arshad	601	1.35	▲1.35
Total valid votes		44,493	100.00	
Total rejected ballots		1,299		
Unreturned ballots		821		
Turnout		46,613	77.45	▲4.50
Registered electors		60,186		
Majority		2,804	6.31	▼39.03
PKR gain from BN		Swing		?

Malaysian general election, 2004
Party	Candidate	Votes	%	∆%
BN	Sothinathan Sinna Goundar	28,494	72.67	▲15.73
PKR	Ab Manap Sahardin	10,717	27.33	▼15.73
Total valid votes		39,211	100.00	
Total rejected ballots		1,489		
Unreturned ballots		489		
Turnout		41,189	72.95	▲6.81
Registered electors		56,459		
Majority		17,777	45.34	▲31.46
BN hold		Swing		

Malaysian general by-election, 10 June 2000 Upon the death of incumbent, S. A. Anpalagan
Party	Candidate	Votes	%	∆%
BN	Sothinathan Sinna Goundar	24,500	56.94	▼4.09
PKR	Ruslan Kasim	18,528	43.06	▲43.06
Total valid votes		43,028	100.00	
Total rejected ballots		1,051		
Unreturned ballots		0		
Turnout		44,079	66.14	▼6.14
Registered electors		66,646		
Majority		5,972	13.88	▼8.18
BN hold		Swing		

Malaysian general election, 1999
Party	Candidate	Votes	%	∆%
BN	S. A. Anpalagan	26,815	61.03	▼12.81
DAP	N. Gobalakrishnan	17,121	38.97	▲12.81
Total valid votes		43,936	100.00	
Total rejected ballots		1,857		
Unreturned ballots		2,770		
Turnout		48,563	72.28	▼0.64
Registered electors		67,187		
Majority		9,694	22.06	▼25.62
BN hold		Swing		

Malaysian general election, 1995
Party	Candidate	Votes	%	∆%
BN	Krishnan Letchumanan	32,543	73.84	▲2.28
DAP	Thangasamy Periasamy	11,528	26.16	▼2.28
Total valid votes		44,071	100.00	
Total rejected ballots		2,224		
Unreturned ballots		1,336		
Turnout		47,651	72.92	▲0.29
Registered electors		65,346		
Majority		21,015	47.68	▲4.56
BN hold		Swing		

Malaysian general election, 1990
Party	Candidate	Votes	%	∆%
BN	T. Marimuthu	22,367	71.56	▼3.39
DAP	N. Mahadevan	8,888	28.44	▲3.39
Total valid votes		31,255	100.00	
Total rejected ballots		1,266		
Unreturned ballots		0		
Turnout		32,521	72.63	▲4.47
Registered electors		44,775		
Majority		13,479	43.12	▼6.78
BN hold		Swing		

Malaysian general election, 1986
Party	Candidate	Votes	%	∆%
BN	K. Pathmanaban	19,193	74.95	▲9.33
DAP	Khoo Seng Hock	6,414	25.05	▼9.33
Total valid votes		25,607	100.00	
Total rejected ballots		834		
Unreturned ballots		0		
Turnout		26,441	68.16	▼8.51
Registered electors		38,790		
Majority		12,779	49.90	▲18.66
BN hold		Swing		

Malaysian general election, 1982
Party	Candidate	Votes	%	∆%
BN	K. Pathmanaban	18,937	65.62	▲9.39
DAP	A. V. Kathiah	9,922	34.38	▼2.01
Total valid votes		28,859	100.00	
Total rejected ballots		1,025		
Unreturned ballots		0		
Turnout		29,884	76.67	▼1.85
Registered electors		38,975		
Majority		9,015	31.24	▲11.40
BN hold		Swing		

Malaysian general election, 1978
Party	Candidate	Votes	%	∆%
BN	K. Pathmanaban	14,521	56.23	▼10.57
DAP	A. V. Kathiah	9,397	36.39	▲10.53
PAS	Azhari Hamzah	1,904	7.37	▲7.37
Total valid votes		25,822	100.00	
Total rejected ballots		493		
Unreturned ballots		0		
Turnout		26,315	78.52	▲3.46
Registered electors		33,512		
Majority		5,124	19.84	▼21.10
BN hold		Swing		

Malaysian general election, 1974
Party	Candidate	Votes	%
BN	K. Pathmanaban	13,996	66.80
DAP	Tang Kai Tong	5,417	25.86
Independent People's Progressive Party	J. Nadchathiram	1,356	6.47
PEKEMAS	S. A. Lingam	182	0.87
Total valid votes		20,951	100.00
Total rejected ballots		689	
Unreturned ballots		0	
Turnout		21,640	75.06
Registered electors		28,831	
Majority		8,579	40.94
This was a new constituency created.
