= Sikamat (state constituency) =

State constituency in Negeri Sembilan, Malaysia

Sikamat (N13)
Negeri Sembilan constituency

State constituency
- Legislature: Negeri Sembilan State Legislative Assembly
MLA
Razali Abu Samah
PN
- Constituency created: 2003
- First contested: 2004
- Last contested: 2026

Demographics
- Electors (2026): 34,103

N13 Sikamat within Negeri Sembilan, as used for the 2023 and 2026 state elections

Sikamat is a state constituency in Negeri Sembilan, Malaysia, that has been represented in the Negeri Sembilan State Legislative Assembly.

The state constituency was first contested in 2004 and is mandated to return a single Assemblyman to the Negeri Sembilan State Legislative Assembly under the first-past-the-post voting system.

== Demographics ==
Ethnic breakdown of Sikamat's electorate as of 2026
1. Malay (71.6%)
2. Chinese (19.0%)
3. Indian (7.70%)
4. Other ethnicities (1.90%)

== History ==
=== Polling districts ===
According to the federal gazette issued on 23 July 2026, the Sikamat constituency is divided into 5 polling districts.

State constituency	Polling district	Code	Location
Sikamat (N13)	Taman Paroi Jaya	128/13/01	SK Taman Paroi Jaya; Kompleks Sukan Negeri Paroi
Sikamat (N13)	Sikamat	128/13/02	Dewan Orang Ramai Taman Perwira; SJK (C) Kampung Seri Sikamat; SMK Warisan Puteri
Sikamat (N13)	Taman Jujur	128/13/03	Dewan Terbuka Desa Kiara; SK Sikamat
Sikamat (N13)	Jalan Sikamat	128/13/04	SMK Dato Sheikh Ahmad
Sikamat (N13)	Taman Desa Rhu	128/13/05	Institut Perguruan Raja Melewar Sikamat; Dewan Orang Ramai Sikamat; SMK Dato' Haji Mohd Redza

=== Representation history ===
Members of the Legislative Assembly for Sikamat
Parliament	No	Years	Member	Party
Constituency split from Ampangan, Senawang and Lobak
11th	N13	2004–2008	Md Yusop Harmain Shah	BN (UMNO)
12th	N13	2008–2013	Aminuddin Harun	PR (PKR)
13th	N13	2013–2018	Aminuddin Harun	PR (PKR)
14th	N13	2018–2023	Aminuddin Harun	PH (PKR)
15th	N13	2023–2026	Aminuddin Harun	PH (PKR)
16th	N13	2026–present	Razali Abu Samah	PN (WAWASAN)

== Election results ==
Negeri Sembilan state election, 2026
Party	Candidate	Votes	%	∆%
PN	Razali Abu Samah	15,052	57.36	▲14.42
PH	Nor Azman Mohamad	10,639	40.55	▼13.75
BERSATU	Tun Faisal Ismail Aziz	548	2.09	▲2.09
Total valid votes		26,239	100.00	
Total rejected ballots		153		
Unreturned ballots		41		
Turnout		26,433	77.51	▲5.03
Registered electors		34,103		
Majority		4,413	16.82	▲5.46
PN gain from PH		Swing		?

Negeri Sembilan state election, 2023
Party	Candidate	Votes	%	∆%
PH	Aminuddin Harun	12,730	54.30	▲54.30
PN	Ahmad Raihan Muhamad Hilal	10,068	42.94	▲42.94
Independent	Mohammed Hafiz Baharudin	339	1.44	▲1.44
Independent	Bujang Abu	83	0.35	▲0.26
Total valid votes		23,444	100.00	
Total rejected ballots		157		
Unreturned ballots		67		
Turnout		23,444	72.48	▼13.38
Registered electors		32,343		
Majority		2,662	11.36	▼8.03
PH hold		Swing		

Negeri Sembilan state election, 2018
Party	Candidate	Votes	%	∆%
PKR	Aminuddin Harun	9,832	55.87	▲4.34
BN	Syamsul Amri Ismail	6,419	36.48	▼11.99
PAS	Rahim Yusof	1,331	7.56	▲7.56
Independent	Bujang Abu	15	0.09	▲0.09
Total valid votes		17,597	100.00	
Total rejected ballots		136		
Unreturned ballots		125		
Turnout		17,858	85.86	▼0.46
Registered electors		20,799		
Majority		3,413	19.39	▲16.33
PKR hold		Swing		

Negeri Sembilan state election, 2013
Party	Candidate	Votes	%	∆%
PKR	Aminuddin Harun	8,584	51.53	▼0.63
BN	Wan Salawati Abdullah	8,074	48.47	▲0.63
Total valid votes		16,658	100.00	
Total rejected ballots		211		
Unreturned ballots		85		
Turnout		16,954	86.32	▲9.95
Registered electors		19,640		
Majority		510	3.06	▼1.26
PKR hold		Swing		

Negeri Sembilan state election, 2008
Party	Candidate	Votes	%	∆%
PKR	Aminuddin Harun	6,036	52.16	▲20.02
BN	Md Yusop Harmain Shah	5,537	47.84	▼20.02
Total valid votes		11,573	100.00	
Total rejected ballots		203		
Unreturned ballots		54		
Turnout		11,830	76.37	▲2.80
Registered electors		15,491		
Majority		499	4.31	▼31.41
PKR gain from BN		Swing		?

Negeri Sembilan state election, 2004
Party	Candidate	Votes	%
BN	Md Yusop Harmain Shah	7,031	67.86
PKR	Rosidan Mohamed	3,330	32.14
Total valid votes		10,361	100.00
Total rejected ballots		190	
Unreturned ballots		0	
Turnout		10,551	73.56
Registered electors		14,343	
Majority		3,701	35.72
This was a new constituency created.
