= Awaludin Said =

Malaysian politician and medical doctor

Yang Berbahagia Dato' Seri Dr. Awaludin Said SSNS DSNS ANS PMC PJK
- أوال‌الدين سعيد

Speaker of the Negeri Sembilan State Legislative Assembly
- Incumbent
- Assumed office 18 August 2026
- Monarch: Muhriz
- Menteri Besar: Ismail Lasim
- Deputy: Kamarol Ridzuan Mohd Zain
- Preceded by: Mk Ibrahim Abdul Rahman
- Constituency: Non-MLA
- In office 18 June 2013 – 7 April 2018
- Monarch: Muhriz
- Menteri Besar: Mohamad Hasan
- Preceded by: Razak Mansor
- Succeeded by: Zulkefly Mohamad Omar
- Constituency: Kota

Member of the Negeri Sembilan State Legislative Assembly for Kota
- In office 21 March 2004 – 12 August 2023
- Preceded by: Zaharudin Mohd Shariff (BN–UMNO)
- Succeeded by: Suhaimi Aini (BN–UMNO)
- Majority: 4,601 (2004); 3,613 (2008); 5,002 (2013); 2,969 (2018)

Independent Non-Executive Chairman of Pharmaniaga Berhad
- Incumbent
- Assumed office 19 July 2024
- Managing Director: Zulkifli Jafar
- Preceded by: Abdul Razak Jaafar

Faction represented in Negeri Sembilan State Legislative Assembly
- 2004–2023: Barisan Nasional

Personal details
- Born: Awaludin bin Said Negeri Sembilan, Malaysia
- Citizenship: Malaysia
- Party: United Malays National Organisation (UMNO)
- Other political affiliations: Barisan Nasional (BN)
- Spouse: Rozaida Noor Mohd Uzair
- Education: University of Malaya (MBBS)
- Occupation: Politician
- Profession: Medical doctor

Awaludin bin Said is a Malaysian politician and medical doctor who has served as Speaker of the Negeri Sembilan State Legislative Assembly since August 2026 and from June 2013 to April 2018 and Independent Non-Executive Chairman of Pharmaniaga Berhad since July 2024. He served as Member of the Negeri Sembilan State Legislative Assembly (MLA) for Kota from March 2004 to August 2023. He is a member, Deputy Division Chief of Rembau and Branch Chief of Sri Kota of the United Malays National Organisation (UMNO), a component party of the Barisan Nasional (BN) coalition. He also sits on three Pharmaniaga Berhad committees, Audit Committee, Board Risk and Investment Committee and Board Tender Committee. He was also a member of the Negeri Sembilan Public Accounts Committee (PAC) from 2004 to 2013 and from 2018 to 2022, Chairman of the Board of Directors of the Negeri Sembilan Islamic Religious Council (MAINS) Zakat Sdn Bhd from 2014 to 2018, Vice Division Chief of Rembau of UMNO prior to his promotion as Deputy Division Chief. Outside politics, he has an extensive medical career, he worked as the Houseman, Medical Officer, Health Officer and Private Medical Practitioner in Seremban General Hospital, Padang Lebar General Health Centre, Batu Kikir, Negeri Sembilan, Tabung Haji, Makkah, Saudi Arabia and Kita Clinic, Ampang, Selangor from 1985 to 2004.

== Election results ==
Negeri Sembilan State Legislative Assembly
Year	Constituency	Candidate	Votes	Pct	Opponent(s)	Votes	Pct	Ballots cast	Majority	Turnout
2004	N28 Kota	Awaludin Said (UMNO)	6,660	76.39%	Zainal Jihin (PAS)	2,058	23.61%	8,933	4,601	74.25%
2008	N28 Kota	Awaludin Said (UMNO)	6,278	70.20%	Azhar Ibrahim (PAS)	2,665	29.80%	9,199	3,613	78.52%
2013	N28 Kota	Awaludin Said (UMNO)	8,131	72.21%	Ghazali Mohd Shom (PAS)	3,129	27.79%	11,452	5,002	86.50%
2018	N28 Kota	Awaludin Said (UMNO)	6,356	57.39%	Sahrizal Masrudin (AMANAH)	3,387	30.57%	11,316	2,969	83.40%
2018	N28 Kota	Awaludin Said (UMNO)	6,356	57.39%	Ishak Omar (PAS)	1,333	12.04%	11,316	2,969	83.40%

== Honours ==
- Negeri Sembilan
  - Knight Grand Companion of Order of Loyalty to Negeri Sembilan (SSNS) – Dato' Seri (2018)
  - Knight Companion of the Order of Loyalty to Negeri Sembilan (DSNS) – Dato' (2006)
  - Member of the Order of Loyalty to Negeri Sembilan (ANS) (2001)
  - Recipient of the Medal for Outstanding Public Service (PMC) (1998)
  - Recipient of the Meritorious Service Medal (PJK) (1996)
