= Lenggeng (state constituency) =

Political subdivision in Malaysia

Lenggeng (N09)
Negeri Sembilan constituency

State constituency
- Legislature: Negeri Sembilan State Legislative Assembly
MLA
Mohd Asna Amin
BN
- Constituency created: 1959
- First contested: 1959
- Last contested: 2026

Demographics
- Electors (2023): 27,386

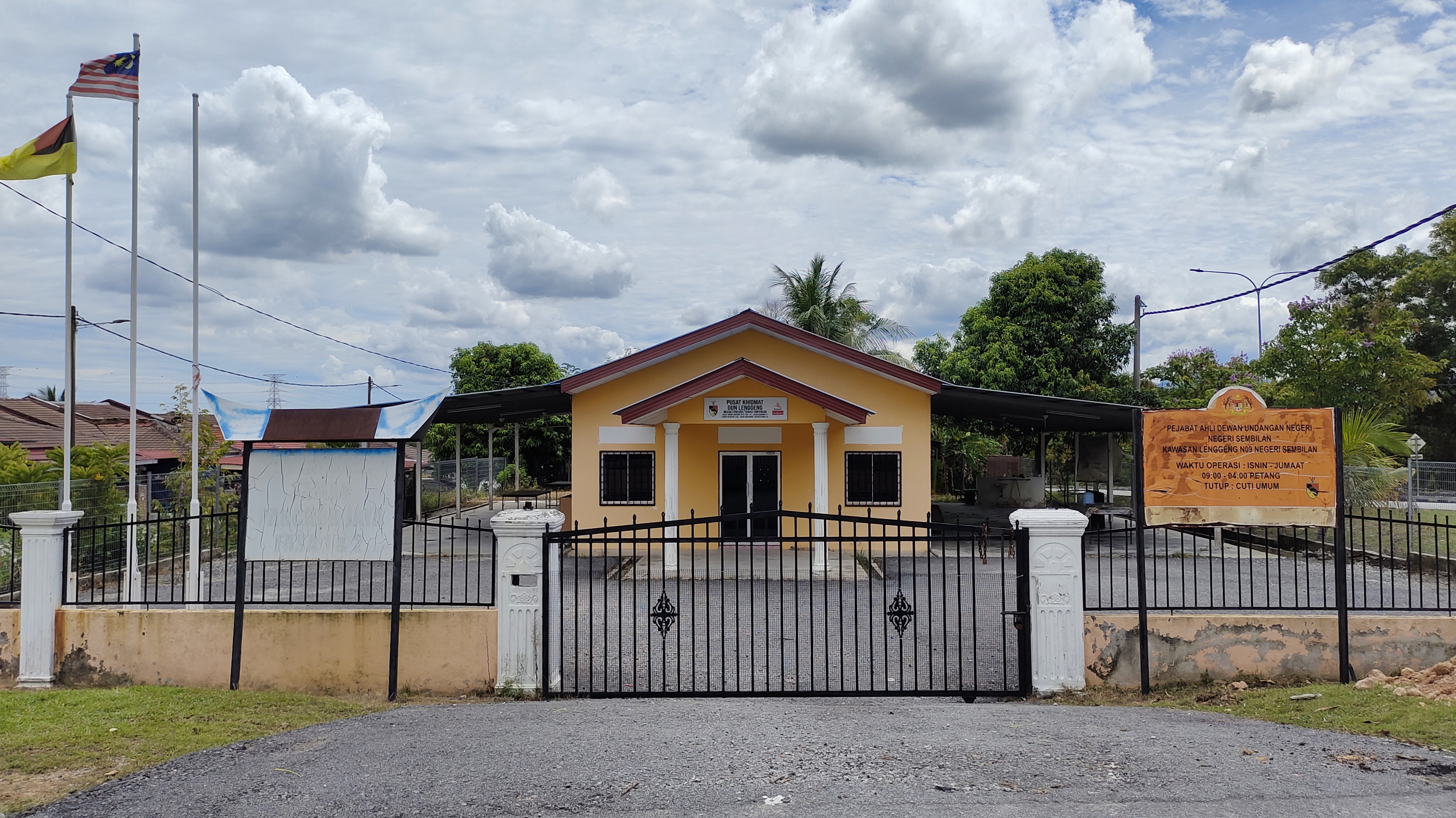
Lenggeng State Constituency Service Centre

N09 Lenggeng within Negeri Sembilan, as used for the 2023 and 2026 state elections

Lenggeng is a state constituency in Negeri Sembilan, Malaysia, that has been represented in the Negeri Sembilan State Legislative Assembly.

The state constituency was first contested in 1959 and is mandated to return a single Assemblyman to the Negeri Sembilan State Legislative Assembly under the first-past-the-post voting system.

== Demographics ==
Ethnic breakdown of Lenggeng's electorate as of 2026
1. Malay (76.7%)
2. Chinese (14.2%)
3. Indian (5.30%)
4. Other ethnicities (3.80%)

== History ==
=== Polling districts ===
According to the federal gazette issued on 23 July 2026, the Lenggeng constituency is divided into 9 polling districts.

State constituency	Polling district	Code	Location
Lenggeng (N09)	Pekan Broga	128/09/01	SJK (C) Kg Baru Broga
Lenggeng (N09)	Ulu Beranang	128/09/02	SK Ulu Beranang
Lenggeng (N09)	Kampong Daching	128/09/03	SK Kampong Daching
Lenggeng (N09)	Kampong Rawa Ulu	128/09/04	SK Mendum
Lenggeng (N09)	Lenggeng	128/09/05	SK Dato' Klana Putra
Lenggeng (N09)	Machang	128/09/06	SK Sungai Jai
Lenggeng (N09)	Desa Sri Pantai	128/09/07	SK Pantai
Lenggeng (N09)	Pantai	128/09/08	Giatmara Seremban
Lenggeng (N09)	Panchor	128/09/09	SK Panchor; SMK Panchor; SJK (C) Kampung Baru Paroi

=== Representation history ===
Members of the Legislative Assembly for Lenggeng
Assembly	No	Years	Name	Party
Constituency created
1st	N22	1959-1964	Abdul Jalil Aminuddin	Alliance (UMNO)
2nd	N22	1964-1969	Zainal Abidin Mohd Lati	Alliance (UMNO)
		1969-1971	Assembly was dissolved	
3rd	N22	1971-1973	Zainal Abidin Mohd Lati	Alliance (UMNO)
3rd	N22	1973-1974	Zainal Abidin Mohd Lati	BN (UMNO)
4th	N05	1974-1978	Siow Soong Sang @ Yun Sang (萧送生)	BN (MCA)
5th	N05	1978-1982	Siow Soong Sang @ Yun Sang (萧送生)	BN (MCA)
6th	N05	1982-1986	Gan Kong Seng (颜光星)	BN (MCA)
7th	N17	1986-1990	Hon Choon Kim (韩春锦)	BN (MCA)
8th	N17	1990-1995	Hon Choon Kim (韩春锦)	BN (MCA)
9th	N19	1995-1999	Ishak Ismail	BN (UMNO)
10th	N19	1999-2004	Ishak Ismail	BN (UMNO)
11th	N09	2004-2008	Ishak Ismail	BN (UMNO)
12th	N09	2008-2013	Mustafa Salim	BN (UMNO)
13th	N09	2013-2017	Ishak Ismail	BN (UMNO)
13th	N09	2017-2018	Vacant (Note: Vacant from 18 July 2017 until the 2018 Malaysian general election due to the incumbent died in office. No by-election was held due to the next general election was less than a year away.)	
14th	N09	2018-2023	Suhaimi Kassim	PH (AMANAH)
15th	N09	2023–2026	Mohd Asna Amin	BN (UMNO)
16th	N09	2026–present	Mohd Asna Amin	BN (UMNO)

== Election results ==
Negeri Sembilan state election, 2026
Party	Candidate	Votes	%	∆%
BN	Mohd Asna Amin	15,960	71.65	▲20.94
PH	Zarinna Abu Zarin	5,966	26.78	▲26.78
BERSATU	Zool Amali Hussein	349	1.57	▲1.57
Total valid votes		22,275	100.00	
Total rejected ballots		243		
Unreturned ballots		30		
Turnout		22,548	78.07	▲4.99
Registered electors		28,880		
Majority		9,994	44.87	▲41.41
BN hold		Swing		

Negeri Sembilan state election, 2023
Party	Candidate	Votes	%	∆%
BN	Mohd Asna Amin	10,040	50.71	▲9.07
PN	Mohd Fadhli Che Me	9,355	47.25	▲47.25
Independent	Zul Azki Mat Sulop	404	2.04	▲2.04
Total valid votes		19,799	100.00	
Total rejected ballots		170		
Unreturned ballots		45		
Turnout		20,014	73.08	▼11.97
Registered electors		27,386		
Majority		685	3.46	▼2.89
BN gain from PKR		Swing		?

Negeri Sembilan state election, 2018
Party	Candidate	Votes	%	∆%
PKR	Suhaimi Kassim	7,456	47.99	▲47.99
BN	Mazlan Maarop	6,470	41.64	▼13.12
PAS	Mohammad Ghazali Abu Bakar	1,612	10.37	▼28.67
Total valid votes		15,538	100.00	
Total rejected ballots		236		
Unreturned ballots		76		
Turnout		15,850	85.05	▼1.77
Registered electors		18,636		
Majority		986	6.35	▼9.37
PKR gain from BN		Swing		?

Negeri Sembilan state election, 2013
Party	Candidate	Votes	%	∆%
BN	Ishak Ismail	7,170	54.76	▼1.78
PAS	Zulkefly Mohamad Omar	5,112	39.04	▼4.42
Independent	Zulkifli Abdullah	812	6.20	▲6.20
Total valid votes		13,094	100.00	
Total rejected ballots		186		
Unreturned ballots		38		
Turnout		13,318	86.82	▲9.07
Registered electors		15,340		
Majority		2,058	15.72	▲2.64
BN hold		Swing		

Negeri Sembilan state election, 2008
Party	Candidate	Votes	%	∆%
BN	Mustafa Salim	5,555	56.54	▼15.98
PAS	Zulkefly Mohamad Omar	4,270	43.46	▲15.98
Total valid votes		9,825	100.00	
Total rejected ballots		188		
Unreturned ballots		0		
Turnout		10,013	77.75	▲3.45
Registered electors		12,879		
Majority		1,285	13.08	▼31.95
BN hold		Swing		

Negeri Sembilan state election, 2004
Party	Candidate	Votes	%	∆%
BN	Ishak Ismail	6,348	72.52	▲6.36
PAS	Zulkefly Mohamad Omar	2,406	27.48	▼6.36
Total valid votes		8,754	100.00	
Total rejected ballots		162		
Unreturned ballots		11		
Turnout		8,927	74.30	▼1.35
Registered electors		12,014		
Majority		3,942	45.03	▲12.72
BN hold		Swing		

Negeri Sembilan state election, 1999
Party	Candidate	Votes	%	∆%
BN	Ishak Ismail	4,885	66.16	▼20.56
PAS	Zulkefly Mohamad Omar	2,499	33.84	▲33.84
Total valid votes		7,384	100.00	
Total rejected ballots		239		
Unreturned ballots		9		
Turnout		7,632	75.65	▲0.72
Registered electors		10,088		
Majority		2,386	32.31	▼41.13
BN hold		Swing		

Negeri Sembilan state election, 1995
Party	Candidate	Votes	%	∆%
BN	Ishak Ismail	5,831	86.72	▲86.72
S46	Mohd Ali Alias	893	13.28	▲13.28
Total valid votes		6,724	100.00	
Total rejected ballots		197		
Unreturned ballots		11		
Turnout		6,932	74.93	▼0.12
Registered electors		9,251		
Majority		4,938	73.44	▲53.43
BN hold		Swing		

Negeri Sembilan state election, 1990
Party	Candidate	Votes	%	∆%
BN	Hon Choon Kim	7,099	58.29	▲0.10
DAP	Chen Hun Chong	4,662	38.28	▲3.59
Independent	Ajus Jais	418	3.43	▲3.43
Total valid votes		12,179	100.00	
Total rejected ballots		396		
Unreturned ballots		23		
Turnout		12,598	75.06	▲1.31
Registered electors		16,785		
Majority		2,437	20.01	▼3.49
BN hold		Swing		

Negeri Sembilan state election, 1986
Party	Candidate	Votes	%	∆%
BN	Hon Choon Kim	6,362	58.19	▼1.62
DAP	Chen Hun Chong	3,793	34.69	▲0.52
PAS	Idris Sulaiman	778	7.12	▲7.12
Total valid votes		10,933	100.00	
Total rejected ballots		349		
Unreturned ballots		0		
Turnout		11,282	73.75	▼2.75
Registered electors		15,298		
Majority		2,569	23.50	▼2.14
BN hold		Swing		

Negeri Sembilan state election, 1982
Party	Candidate	Votes	%	∆%
BN	Gan Kong Seng	5,399	59.81	▼0.34
DAP	Lum Kong	3,085	34.18	▼5.68
Independent	Jalaludin Shamsudi	543	6.02	▲6.02
Total valid votes		9,027	100.00	
Total rejected ballots		219		
Unreturned ballots		0		
Turnout		9,246	76.50	▼1.48
Registered electors		12,087		
Majority		2,314	25.63	▲5.34
BN hold		Swing		

Negeri Sembilan state election, 1978
Party	Candidate	Votes	%	∆%
BN	Siow Soong Sang	4,756	60.15	▲2.77
DAP	Yap Kit Loong	3,151	39.85	▲33.63
Total valid votes		7,907	100.00	
Total rejected ballots		382		
Unreturned ballots		0		
Turnout		8,289	77.98	▼2.89
Registered electors		10,630		
Majority		1,605	20.30	▼8.64
BN hold		Swing		

Negeri Sembilan state election, 1974
Party	Candidate	Votes	%	∆%
BN	Siow Soong Sang	4,029	57.38	▲57.38
Parti Sosialis Rakyat Malaysia	Yim Chee Chong	1,997	28.44	▲28.44
DAP	Mohd. Sharif	437	6.22	▼41.38
PEKEMAS	Mokhtar Hitam	338	4.81	▲4.81
IPPP	Jalaludin Shamsudin	221	3.15	▲3.15
Total valid votes		7,022	100.00	
Total rejected ballots		352		
Unreturned ballots		0		
Turnout		7,374	80.86	▲4.69
Registered electors		9,119		
Majority		2,032	28.94	▲28.27
BN gain from Alliance		Swing		-

Negeri Sembilan state election, 1969
Party	Candidate	Votes	%	∆%
Alliance	Zainal Abidin Mohd. Lati	2,970	48.27	▼9.26
DAP	Lim Cheng Hoe	2,929	47.60	▲47.60
PCMB	Tai Antek Liat	254	4.13	▲4.13
Total valid votes		6,153	100.00	
Total rejected ballots		462		
Unreturned ballots		0		
Turnout		6,615	76.17	▼6.49
Registered electors		8,684		
Majority		41	0.67	▼22.88
Alliance hold		Swing		

Negeri Sembilan state election, 1964
Party	Candidate	Votes	%	∆%
Alliance	Zainal Abidin Mohd. Lati	3,746	57.53	▲1.89
Socialist Front	Ibrahim Baba	2,213	33.99	▲9.18
UDP	Leong Yew Soong	552	8.48	▲8.48
Total valid votes		6,511	100.00	
Total rejected ballots		279		
Unreturned ballots		0		
Turnout		6,790	82.66	▲2.21
Registered electors		8,214		
Majority		1,533	23.54	▼7.29
Alliance hold		Swing		

Negeri Sembilan state election, 1959
Party	Candidate	Votes	%
Alliance	Abdul Jalil Aminudin	2,494	55.64
Socialist Front	Mohd. Amin Rashid	1,112	24.81
PMIP	Ismail Tamin	842	18.79
Independent	Siow Loong Hin	34	0.76
Total valid votes		4,482	100.00
Total rejected ballots		215	
Unreturned ballots		0	
Turnout		4,697	80.46
Registered electors		5,838	
Majority		1,382	30.83
This was a new constituency created.
