= Zulkefly Mohamad Omar =

Malaysian politician (1964–2023)

Yang Berbahagia Dato' Zulkefly Mohamad Omar DPNS
- ذوالكفل محمد عمر

Speaker of the Negeri Sembilan State Legislative Assembly
- In office 2 July 2018 – 12 August 2023
- Monarch: Muhriz
- Menteri Besar: Aminuddin Harun
- Deputy: Ravi Munusamy
- Preceded by: Awaludin Said
- Succeeded by: Mk Ibrahim Abdul Rahman
- Constituency: Non-MLA

Personal details
- Born: Zulkefly bin Mohamad Omar; 7 July 1964 Negeri Sembilan, Malaysia
- Died: 21 October 2023 (aged 59) Sultan Idris Shah Serdang Hospital, Sepang District, Selangor, Malaysia
- Party: Malaysian Islamic Party (PAS) (–2015); National Trust Party (AMANAH) (2015–2023)
- Other political affiliations: Barisan Alternatif (BA) (1999–2004); Pakatan Rakyat (PR) (2008–2015); Pakatan Harapan (PH) (2015–2023)
- Occupation: Politician

Dato' Zulkefly Mohamad bin Omar (7 July 1964 – 21 October 2023) was a Malaysian politician who served as Speaker of the Negeri Sembilan State Legislative Assembly from July 2018 to July 2023. He was a member of the National Trust Party (AMANAH), a component party of the Pakatan Harapan (PH) coalition. He was a member and State Vice Chairman of Negeri Sembilan of the Malaysian Islamic Party (PAS), a component party of the formerly Pakatan Rakyat (PR) and Barisan Alternatif (BA) coalitions. He died on 21 October 2023, at the age of 59.

== Election results ==
Parliament of Malaysia
Year	Constituency	Candidate	Votes	Pct	Opponent(s)	Votes	Pct	Ballots cast	Majority	Turnout
2022	P126 Jelebu	Zulkefly Mohamad Omar (AMANAH)	13,680	30.18%	Jalaluddin Alias (UMNO)	21,805	48.10%	45,334	8,125	75.11%
2022	P126 Jelebu	Zulkefly Mohamad Omar (AMANAH)	13,680	30.18%	Zaharuddon Baba Semon (BERSATU)	9,596	21.17%	45,334	8,125	75.11%
2022	P126 Jelebu	Zulkefly Mohamad Omar (AMANAH)	13,680	30.18%	Ahmad Fakri Abu Samah (PUTRA)	253	0.56%	45,334	8,125	75.11%

Negeri Sembilan State Legislative Assembly
Year	Constituency	Candidate	Votes	Pct	Opponent(s)	Votes	Pct	Ballots cast	Majority	Turnout%
1999	N19 Lenggeng	Zulkefly Mohamad Omar (PAS)	2,499	33.84%	Ishak Ismail (UMNO)	4,885	66.16%	7,632	2,387	75.65%
2004	N09 Lenggeng	Zulkefly Mohamad Omar (PAS)	2,406	27.48%	Ishak Ismail (UMNO)	6,348	72.52%	8,927	3,942	74.30%
2008	N09 Lenggeng	Zulkefly Mohamad Omar (PAS)	4,270	43.46%	Mustafa Salim (UMNO)	5,555	56.54%	10,013	1,285	77.75%
2009	N31 Bagan Pinang	Zulkefly Mohamad Omar (PAS)	2,578	24.34%	Mohd Isa Abdul Samad (UMNO)	8,013	75.66%	11,170	5,435	81.75%
2013	N09 Lenggeng	Zulkefly Mohamad Omar (PAS)	5,112	39.04%	Ishak Ismail (UMNO)	7,170	54.76%	13,280	2,058	86.80%
2013	N09 Lenggeng	Zulkefly Mohamad Omar (PAS)	5,112	39.04%	Hanafi Zulkapli (IND)	812	6.20%	13,280	2,058	86.80%
2018	N19 Johol	Zulkefly Mohamad Omar (AMANAH)	2,942	37.16%	Saiful Yazan Sulaiman (UMNO)	3,907	49.34%	8,150	965	82.40%
2018	N19 Johol	Zulkefly Mohamad Omar (AMANAH)	2,942	37.16%	Kamaruddin Md Tahir (PAS)	1,069	13.50%	8,150	965	82.40%

== Honours ==
- Negeri Sembilan
  - Knight Commander of the Order of Loyalty to Negeri Sembilan (DPNS) – Dato' (2019)
