= Saiful Yazan Sulaiman =

Malaysian politician

Yang Berhormat Dato' Saiful Yazan Sulaiman DBNS JSM ANS PMC PJK MLA
- سيف اليزن سليمان

Member of the Negeri Sembilan State Legislative Assembly for Johol
- Incumbent
- Assumed office 9 May 2018
- Preceded by: Abu Samah Mahat (BN–UMNO)
- Majority: 965 (2018); 2,117 (2023)

Personal details
- Party: United Malays National Organisation (UMNO)
- Other political affiliations: Barisan Nasional (BN)
- Spouse: Shaliza Idris
- Occupation: Politician

Saiful Yazan bin Sulaiman is a Malaysian politician who has served as a Member of the Negeri Sembilan State Legislative Assembly for Johol since May 2018. He is a member and the Division Secretary of Kuala Pilah of the United Malays National Organisation (UMNO), a component party of the Barisan Nasional (BN) coalition.

== Election results ==
Negeri Sembilan State Legislative Assembly
Year	Constituency	Candidate	Votes	Pct	Opponent(s)	Votes	Pct	Ballots cast	Majority	Turnout
2018	N19 Johol	Saiful Yazan Sulaiman (UMNO)	3,907	49.34%	Zulkefly Mohamad Omar (AMANAH)	2,942	37.16%	8,150	965	82.40%
2018	N19 Johol	Saiful Yazan Sulaiman (UMNO)	3,907	49.34%	Kamaruddin Md Tahir (PAS)	1,069	13.50%	8,150	965	82.40%
2023	N19 Johol	Saiful Yazan Sulaiman (UMNO)	5,228	62.69%	Kamaruddin Mat Tahir (PAS)	3,111	37.31%	8,412	2,117	68.32%

== Honours ==
- Malaysia
  - Companion of the Order of Loyalty to the Crown of Malaysia (JSM) (2022)
- Negeri Sembilan
  - Knight of the Order of Loyal Service to Negeri Sembilan (DBNS) – Dato' (2024)
  - Member of the Order of Loyalty to Negeri Sembilan (ANS) (2015)
  - Recipient of the Medal for Outstanding Public Service (PMC) (2011)
  - Recipient of the Meritorious Service Medal (PJK) (2005)
