= Badrul Hisham Shaharin =

Malaysian politician

- بدر الهشام شهارين
- Born: Badrul Hisham bin Shaharin; 23 September 1978 (age 48); Rembau, Negeri Sembilan, Malaysia
- Other name: Chegubard
- Occupation: Politician
- Political party: Parti Keadilan Nasional (KeADILan) (1999–2004); People's Justice Party (PKR) (2004–2016); Malaysian United Indigenous Party (BERSATU) (2020–2026); National Vision Party (WAWASAN) (since 2026)
- Other political affiliations: Barisan Alternatif (BA) (1999–2004); Pakatan Rakyat (PR) (2008–2015); Pakatan Harapan (PH) (2015–2016); Perikatan Nasional (PN) (since 2020)
- Spouse: Zarerah Hanim Md Zaki
- Children: 2
- Website: Badrul Hisham Shaharin on Blogger

Badrul Hisham bin Shaharin (Jawi: بدر الهشام شهارين; born 23 September 1978), better known as Chegubard, is a Malaysian activist and politician. He was a member of Malaysian United Indigenous Party (BERSATU) in the Perikatan Nasional (PN) coalition. He is also the chief of Solidariti Anak Muda Malaysia (SAMM), a prominent Malaysian youth NGO.

== Political career ==
Badrul Hisham contested the state seat of Rantau in Negeri Sembilan during the 2004 general election against the incumbent Menteri Besar then, Mohamad Hasan but was defeated. In the 2008 general election, he contested the Rembau parliamentary seat in Negeri Sembilan against UMNO youth leader, Khairy Jamaluddin but was subsequently defeated too. He contested the Sungai Acheh state seat in Penang in the 2013 general election and lost again.

In August 2016, PKR has sacked Badrul Hisham for damaging the image of the party and causing divisions among the members by defying party's orders.

In April 2024, the Police arrested Badrul Hisham for a statement he made regarding purported business dealings of Ibrahim Iskandar of Johor.

== Election results ==
Negeri Sembilan State Legislative Assembly
Year	Constituency	Candidate	Votes	Pct	Opponent(s)	Votes	Pct	Ballots cast	Majority	Turnout
2004	N27 Rantau	Badrul Hisham Shaharin (PKR)	1,832	18.09%	Mohamad Hasan (UMNO)	8,031	79.30%	10,127	6,199	72.77%

Parliament of Malaysia
Year	Constituency	Candidate	Votes	Pct	Opponent(s)	Votes	Pct	Ballots cast	Majority	Turnout
2008	P131 Rembau	Badrul Hisham Shaharin (PKR)	20,779	42.49%	Khairy Jamaluddin (UMNO)	26,525	54.24%	48,901	5,746	77.75%

Penang State Legislative Assembly
Year	Constituency	Candidate	Votes	Pct	Opponent(s)	Votes	Pct	Ballots cast	Majority	Turnout
2013	N21 Sungai Acheh	Badrul Hisham Shaharin (PKR)	6,083	43.82%	Mahmud Zakaria (UMNO)	6,891	49.64%	13,881	808	89.03%
2013	N21 Sungai Acheh	Badrul Hisham Shaharin (PKR)	6,083	43.82%	Mohd Yusni Mat Piah (PAS)	690	4.97%	13,881	808	89.03%
