= 2019 Rantau by-election =

- 13 April 2019

N27 Rantau seat in the Negeri Sembilan State Legislative Assembly
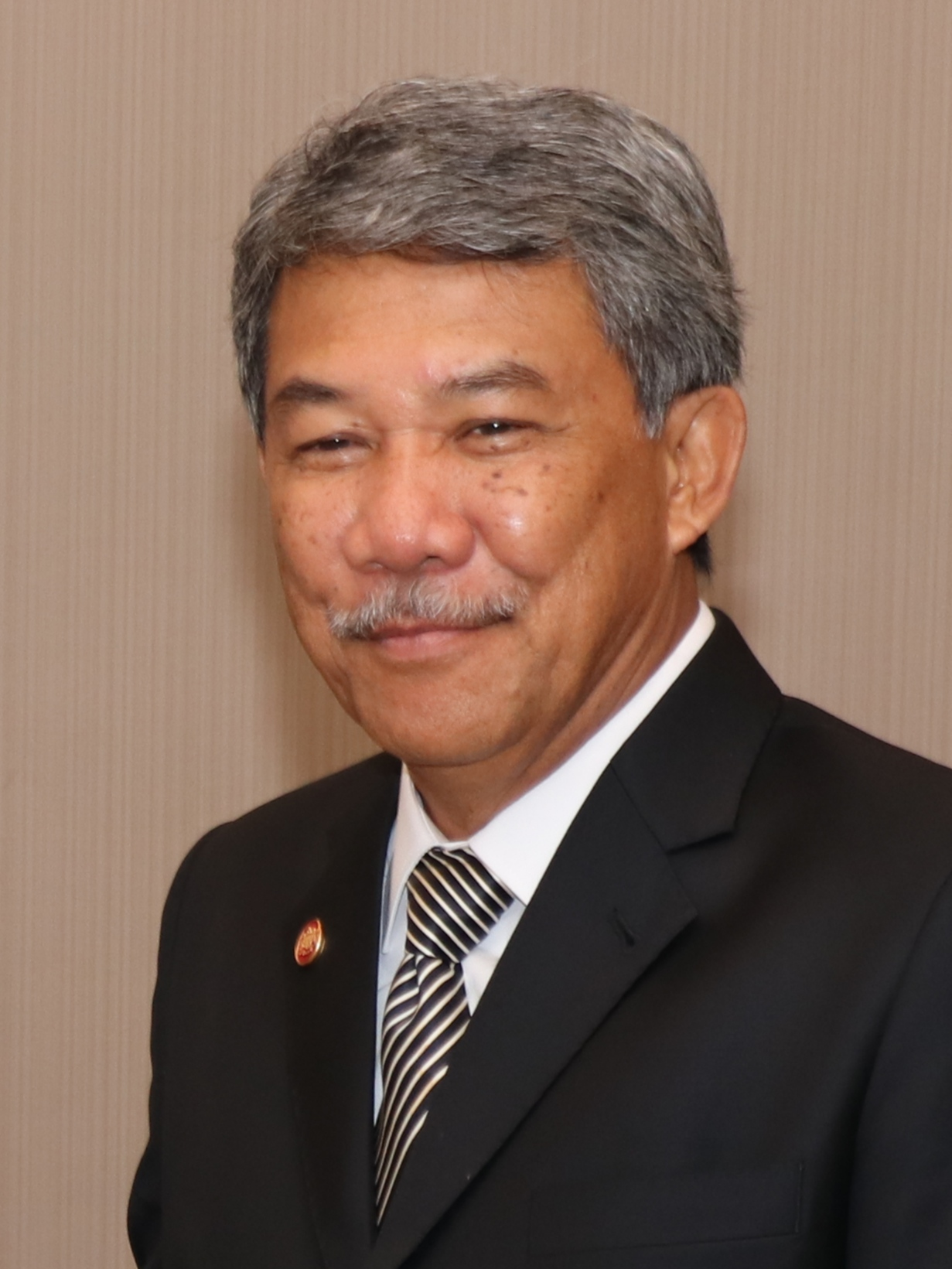
	Majority party	Minority party
		PH
Candidate	Mohamad Hasan	Streram Sinnasamy
Party	UMNO	PKR
Alliance	BN	PH
Popular vote	10,397	5,887
Percentage	63.22%	35.80%
	Third party	Fourth party
	IND	IND
Candidate	Malar Rajaram	Mohd Nor Yasin
Party	Independent	Independent
Popular vote	83	79
Percentage	0.50%	0.48%
- N27 Rantau state constituency border and the districts included within the constituency.
MLA before election
Mohamad Hasan (nullified)
Barisan Nasional (UMNO)
Elected MLA
Mohamad Hasan
Barisan Nasional (UMNO)

The N27 Rantau state constituency boundaries within the P131 Rembau parliamentary constituency in Negeri Sembilan.

A by-election was held on 13 April 2019 for the Negeri Sembilan State Legislative Assembly seat of Rantau. The seat became vacant after the uncontested election of incumbent Mohamad Hasan of the United Malays National Organisation (UMNO), a component of Barisan Nasional (BN) coalition was declared null and void.

In the 2018 elections, Mohamad Hasan, the 3-term former Menteri Besar of Negeri Sembilan won the seat uncontested after People's Justice Party (PKR)’s candidate Dr Streram Sinnansamy was not allowed to enter the Nomination Centre to file his papers. However, the Election Court has on the 16 November 2018, allowed the petition by Dr S. Streram and passed a ruling that Mohamad Hasan had not been duly elected. A fresh election was called to be held after Mohamad Hasan's appeal was dismissed by the Federal Court on 18 February 2019.

The nomination day was on 30 March, with a about 2-week campaigning period until election day. The constituency has 20,926 registered voters- 20,804 ordinary voters, 118 early voters and four absentee voters.

Barisan Nasional's Mohamad Hasan won the by-election with a 4,510 majority and retained the seat again. It was the third consecutive by-election victory for the BN coalition. The other two being the Cameron Highlands and Semenyih by-elections.

== Nominations ==
The UMNO acting president Mohamad Hasan declared he is ready to defend the Rantau seat again, after the Federal Court upheld an Election Court's ruling to nullify the result of him winning the seat unopposed in the last general election.

Meanwhile, Dr S. Streram, an anaesthetist who is the Rembau PKR deputy chief, said he would leave the candidacy to the party leadership and vowed not to contest as an independent if he was not selected as candidate for the Rantau by-election. On 11 March 2019, he was chosen as the PH candidate for the by-election.

PKR member and businessman, Hazan Khalid initially decided on 27 March 2019 that he would contest as an independent candidate after he disagreed with the candidacy of Dr S. Streram, as the PH candidate. However he didn't turn up to file his papers on Nomination Day.

On Nomination Day, alongside Mohamad Hasan and Dr S. Streram, two independents, retired teacher Mohd Nor Yasin (pen logo) and housewife Malar Rajaram (tree logo) submitted their papers. The EC confirmed a four-cornered fight for the by-election.

== Controversies and issues ==
Dr S. Streram was alleged to borrowed and failed to repay Segamat Member of Parliament Datuk Seri Dr R. Santhara Kumar a debt of RM60,000 for his child's education which he claimed that he had repaid the debt in full. PH chairman Tun Dr Mahathir Mohamad said that Dr S. Streram was selected as candidate as he is not a bankrupt and PH is upholding its principles as Dr S. Streram was denied from a fair contest in the 14th general election.

Mohamad Hasan told the public to look into his past contributions before calling him a racist. Mohamad's past speeches which purportedly touch on vernacular schools and remarks describing non-Malays were which alleged to be racists and has sparked outrage among the public.

Independent candidate, Mohd Nor Yassin had been confirmed to be a member of National Trust Party (AMANAH). The party planned to expel him from the party for contesting as an independent and not supporting the PH Candidate. Mohd Nor Yassin was also the Pan-Malaysian Islamic Party (PAS) candidate for the state constituency of Gemencheh during the 2013 general election. He was expelled from AMANAH on the same day.

Former Malacca Chief Minister, Idris Haron promised in a campaign speech that if BN won the by-election, they will provide two goats for a feast. EC Chairman, Azhar Harun, has confirmed that it's an election offense.

A provocation banner displaying sensitive and racism messages has been hung up in the Rantau area. Mohamad Hasan, the BN candidate has denied claims of BN hanging the banner. Streram meanwhile lodged a police report on the matter.

A case involving an RM10 million being remitted and transferred through a money changer by Mohamad to buy a luxury apartment in London has been brought up by the Speaker of the Negeri Sembilan State Legislative Assembly. Mohamad however has denied claims of any wrongdoing by him. Mohamad was asked to explain the reason he used a money changer instead of a bank to transfer RM10 million and also his connection on a RM6 million Minangkabau design bungalow in Seremban.

A video emerged of five individuals in clothing bearing PH logos searching a police car on polling day as they suspected extra ballot boxes were being ferried in the vehicle, but their search only turned up to be false alarm.

Meanwhile, arguments and physical fights among the PKR machinery members had erupted at the PH's Rantau command centre following unofficial reports of its candidate Dr S. Streram's defeat in the Rantau by-election. The incident was said to be happened because of misunderstanding and disagreement over the machinery payment.

== Results ==
Negeri Sembilan state by-election, 2019: Rantau Upon the nullification of the incumbent, Mohamad Hasan
Party	Candidate	Votes	%	∆%
BN	Mohamad Hasan	10,397	63.22	-1.53
PH	Streram Sinnasamy	5,887	35.80	+0.55
Independent	Malar Rajaram	83	0.50	N/A
Independent	Mohd Nor Yasin	79	0.48	N/A
Total valid votes		16,446	100.00	
Total rejected ballots		146		
Unreturned ballots		4		
Turnout		16,596	79.31	
Registered electors		20,926		
Majority		4,510		
BN hold		Swing		-1.04
Source(s): 1. "Keputusan Pilihan Raya Kecil N.27 Rantau". Suruhanjaya Pilihan Raya Malaysia. 2019-04-13. Archived from the original on 2020-10-28.

=== Results according to polling districts ===
Voting District Code	Voting District	Party
131/27/01	Kampong Sendayan	BN
131/27/02	Sendayan	BN
131/27/03	Taman Kelab Tuanku	BN
131/27/04	Kampung Mambau	BN
131/27/05	Kampung Bemban	BN
131/27/06	Kuala Sawah	BN
131/27/07	Kampong Sri Lalang	BN
131/27/08	Kampong Sega	BN
131/27/09	Pekan Sagga	BN
131/27/10	Rantau	BN
131/27/11	Linsum	BN
131/27/12	Kampung Siliau	BN
131/27/13	Angsa Emas	BN
131/27/14	Bandar Ekar	PH

Early and post votes

Voting District	Party
Post Vote	BN
Early Vote	BN

== Previous results ==
Negeri Sembilan state election, 2018: Rantau
Party	Candidate	Votes	%	∆%
On the nomination day, Mohamad Hasan won uncontested.
BN	Mohamad Hasan	N/A	N/A	N/A

Negeri Sembilan state election, 2013: Rantau
Party	Candidate	Votes	%	∆%
BN	Mohamad Hasan	10,126	64.75	-1.42
PKR	Aisah Lamsah	5,513	35.25	+1.42
Total valid votes		15,639	100.00	
Total rejected ballots		239		
Unreturned ballots		0		
Turnout		15,878	87.09	
Registered electors		18,232		
Majority		4,613		
BN hold		Swing		-1.42
Source(s) "Federal Government Gazette - Notice of Contested Election, State Legislative Assembly for the State of Negeri Sembilan [P.U. (B) 193/2013]" (PDF). Attorney General's Chambers of Malaysia. 26 April 2013. "Federal Government Gazette - Results of Contested Election and Statements of the Poll after the Official Addition of Votes, State Constituencies for the State of Negeri Sembilan [P.U. (B) 234/2013]" (PDF). Attorney General's Chambers of Malaysia. 22 May 2013.
