= Rembau (federal constituency) =

Constituency of Negeri Sembilan, Malaysia

Rembau (P131)
Negeri Sembilan constituency

Federal constituency
- Legislature: Dewan Rakyat
- MP: Mohamad Hasan; BN
- Constituency created: 2003
- First contested: 2004
- Last contested: 2022

Demographics
- Population (2020): 210,209
- Electors (2026): 143,120
- Area (km²): 635
- Pop. density (per km²): 331

Rembau is a federal constituency in Rembau District and Seremban District, Negeri Sembilan, Malaysia, that has been represented in the Dewan Rakyat since 2004.

The federal constituency was created in the 2003 redistribution and is mandated to return a single member to the Dewan Rakyat under the first past the post voting system.

== Demographics ==
Ethnic breakdown of Rembau's electorate as of 2022
1. Malay (73.6%)
2. Indian (15.9%)
3. Chinese (8.80%)
4. Other ethnicities (1.70%)

As of 2020, Rembau has a population of 210,209 people.

Age breakdown of Rembau's electorate as of 2022
1. 18-20 (7.51%)
2. 21-29 (24.1%)
3. 30-39 (21.9%)
4. 40-49 (16.1%)
5. 50-59 (13.9%)
6. 60-69 (10.5%)
7. 70-79 (4.21%)
8. 80-89 (1.46%)
9. above 90 (0.32%)
Gender breakdown of Rembau's electorate as of 2022
1. Male (49.1%)
2. Female (50.9%)

== History ==
=== Polling districts ===
According to the gazette issued on 23 July 2026, the Rembau constituency has a total of 51 polling districts.

State constituency	Polling districts	Code	Location
Paroi（N25）	Paroi	131/25/01	SK Paroi
Paroi（N25）	Taman Satria	131/25/02	SK Taman Seri Pagi; SMK Seri Pagi; SA Rakyat Bestari Taman Rasa Sayang
Paroi（N25）	Taman Tuanku Jaafar	131/25/03	SK Taman Tuanku Jaafar 2; SMK Taman Tuanku Jaafar
Paroi（N25）	Taman Sri Permata	131/25/04	Sekolah Dato' Abdul Razak
Paroi（N25）	Kombok	131/25/05	SJK (T) Ladang Kombok
Paroi（N25）	Taman Tasik Jaya	131/25/06	SK Taman Tasik Jaya; Dewan Orang Ramai Taman Tasik Jaya
Paroi（N25）	Bukit Seri Senawang	131/25/07	SJK (T) Ladang Senawang; SJK (T) Ladang Seremban; SK Taman Tuanku Jaafar
Paroi（N25）	Taman Kobena	131/25/08	SK Senawang 3; Tabika Perpaduan Taman Desa Ixora
Paroi（N25）	Senawang Jaya	131/25/09	SK Senawang; SK Lavender Height
Paroi（N25）	Taman Marida	131/25/10	SMK Senawang; SA As-Sa'idiyyah
Chembong (N26)	Ulu Pedas	131/26/01	SMA Dato Haji Abu Hassan Haji Sail
Chembong (N26)	Sepri	131/26/02	SK Sepri
Chembong (N26)	Kampong Rendah	131/26/03	SK Kayu Ara
Chembong (N26)	Kampong Senama Ulu	131/26/04	SK Taman Seri Rembau
Chembong (N26)	Chembong	131/26/05	SMK Dato' Sedia Raja
Chembong (N26)	Pekan Pedas	131/26/06	SJK (C) Pei Hwa Pedas
Chembong (N26)	Kampong Pedas Tengah	131/26/07	SK Pedas
Chembong (N26)	Pekan Rembau	131/26/08	SMK Undang Rembau; SJK (C) Yuk Hua Rembau
Chembong (N26)	Batu Hampar	131/26/09	SK Seberang Batu Hampar
Chembong (N26)	Mampong	131/26/10	SK Undang Rembau
Chembong (N26)	Pilin	131/26/11	UITM Cawangan Negeri Sembilan Kampus Rembau
Chembong (N26)	Kundor	131/26/12	SK Kundor
Rantau (N27)	Kampong Sendayan	131/27/01	SMK Bandar Baru Seri Sendayan
Rantau (N27)	Sendayan	131/27/02	SK Sri Sendayan; SK Sendayan
Rantau (N27)	Taman Kelab Tuanku	131/27/03	SMK Mambau
Rantau (N27)	Kampong Mambau	131/27/04	SK Mambau
Rantau (N27)	Kampong Bemban	131/27/05	SJK (T) Ladang Shanghai Seremban
Rantau (N27)	Kuala Sawah	131/27/06	SK Nyatoh
Rantau (N27)	Kampong Sri Lalang	131/27/07	SK Datuk Akhir Zaman
Rantau (N27)	Kampong Sega	131/27/08	SK Sega
Rantau (N27)	Pekan Sagga	131/27/09	SJK (T) Ldg Sagga
Rantau (N27)	Rantau	131/27/10	SJK (C) Chung Hua Rantau; Kompleks Sukan Komuniti Rantau
Rantau (N27)	Linsum	131/27/11	SK Dato' Raja Melana
Rantau (N27)	Kampong Siliau	131/27/12	SK Seliau
Rantau (N27)	Angsa Emas	131/27/13	Dewan Orang Ramai Taman Angsamas
Rantau (N27)	Bandar Ekar	132/27/14	SJK (T) Rantau
Kota (N28)	Kampong Batu	131/28/01	SK Kampong Batu
Kota (N28)	Selemak	131/28/02	SK Salak Nama
Kota (N28)	Kampong Bongek	131/28/03	SK Bongek
Kota (N28)	Kampong Chengkau Ulu	131/28/04	Balai Raya Chengkau Ulu Rantau; Tabika Kemas Kampung Chengkau Ulu
Kota (N28)	Kampong Gadong	131/28/05	SMA Haji Mohd. Yatim
Kota (N28)	Kampong Kendong	131/28/06	SK Kota
Kota (N28)	Kota	131/28/07	SJK (C) Pei Teck
Kota (N28)	Semerbok	131/28/08	SK Semerbok
Kota (N28)	Kampong Sawah Raja	131/28/09	SK Sawah Raja
Kota (N28)	Titian Bintangor	131/28/10	SK Dato Shah Bandar Rembau
Kota (N28)	Astana Raja	131/28/11	SK Astana Raja
Kota (N28)	Legong Ulu	131/28/12	SK Legong Ulu
Kota (N28)	Pekan Chengkau	131/28/13	SK Chengkau
Kota (N28)	Kampong Penajis	131/28/14	SK Tun Haji Abdul Malek
Kota (N28)	Kampong Pulau Mampat	131/28/15	SK Pulau Besar

=== Representation history ===
Members of Parliament for Rembau
Parliament	No	Years	Member	Party	Vote Share
Constituency created from Rasah, Telok Kemang, Seremban and Tampin
11th	P131	2004–2008	Firdaus Muhammad Rom Harun (فردوس محمد روم هارون)	BN (UMNO)	28,664; 74.12%
12th	P131	2008–2013	Khairy Jamaluddin Abu Bakar (خيري جمال الدين ابو بكر)	BN (UMNO)	26,525; 56.07%
13th	P131	2013–2018	Khairy Jamaluddin Abu Bakar (خيري جمال الدين ابو بكر)	BN (UMNO)	43,053; 63.24%
14th	P131	2018–2022	Khairy Jamaluddin Abu Bakar (خيري جمال الدين ابو بكر)	BN (UMNO)	36,096; 48.87%
15th	P131	2022–present	Mohamad Hasan (محمد حسن)	BN (UMNO)	53,075; 48.50%

=== State constituency ===
Parliamentary constituency	State constituency						
Parliamentary constituency	1955–59*	1959–1974	1974–1986	1986–1995	1995–2004	2004–2018	2018–present
Rembau						Chembong	
Rembau						Kota	
Rembau						Paroi	
Rembau						Rantau	

=== Historical boundaries ===
State Constituency	Area	
State Constituency	2003	2018
Chembong	Chembong; Kampung Kundur Tengah; Kampung Orang Asli Ulu Chuai; Pedas; Rembau	
Kota	Chengkau; Kampung Orang Asli Pabai Miku; Kampung Pulau Hanyut; Kota; Lubuk China	
Paroi	Paroi; Senawang; Sungai Gadut; Taman Nusa Intan; Taman Tasik Jaya	Kampung Sentosa; Paroi; Senawang; Sungai Gadut; Taman Nusa Intan; Taman Tasik Jaya
Rantau	Kampung Kanchong; Kampung Silau; Nusari Bayu; Rantau; Sendayan	

=== Current state assembly members ===
No.	State Constituency	Member	Coalition (Party)
N25	Paroi	Kamarol Ridzuan Mohd Zain	PN (PAS)
N26	Chembong	Zaifulbahri Idris	BN (UMNO)
N27	Rantau	Mohamad Hasan	BN (UMNO)
N28	Kota	Suhaimi Aini	BN (UMNO)

=== Local governments & postcodes ===
No.	State Constituency	Local Government	Postcode
N25	Paroi	Seremban City Council	70300, 70400, 70450, 71450 Seremban; 71100, 71200 Rantau; 71150 Linggi; 71300, 71400 Rembau; 71350 Kota; 71900 Labu; 73100 Johol
N26	Chembong	Rembau District Council	70300, 70400, 70450, 71450 Seremban; 71100, 71200 Rantau; 71150 Linggi; 71300, 71400 Rembau; 71350 Kota; 71900 Labu; 73100 Johol
N27	Rantau	Seremban City Council	70300, 70400, 70450, 71450 Seremban; 71100, 71200 Rantau; 71150 Linggi; 71300, 71400 Rembau; 71350 Kota; 71900 Labu; 73100 Johol
N28	Kota	Rembau District Council	70300, 70400, 70450, 71450 Seremban; 71100, 71200 Rantau; 71150 Linggi; 71300, 71400 Rembau; 71350 Kota; 71900 Labu; 73100 Johol

== Election results ==
Malaysian general election, 2022
Party	Candidate	Votes	%	∆%
BN	Mohamad Hasan	53,075	48.50	▼0.37
PH	Jufitri Joha	33,178	30.92	▼11.05
PN	Mohd Nazree Mohd Yunus	21,875	19.99	▲19.99
Parti Sosialis Malaysia	Tinagaram Subramaniam	779	0.71	▲0.71
PEJUANG	Ramly Awalludin	529	0.48	▲0.48
Total valid votes		109,436	100.00	
Total rejected ballots		826		
Unreturned ballots		324		
Turnout		110,586	81.94	▼3.29
Registered electors		133,555		
Majority		19,897	17.58	▲11.68
BN hold		Swing		
Source(s) https://lom.agc.gov.my/ilims/upload/portal/akta/outputp/1753263/PUB615%20PARLIMEN%20NEGERI%20SEMBILAN.pdf

Malaysian general election, 2018
Party	Candidate	Votes	%	∆%
BN	Khairy Jamaluddin Abu Bakar	36,096	48.87	▼14.37
PKR	Roseli Abdul Gani	31,732	42.97	▼6.69
PAS	Mustafa Dolah	6,028	8.16	▲8.16
Total valid votes		73,856	100.00	
Total rejected ballots		1,053		
Unreturned ballots		406		
Turnout		75,315	85.23	▼2.07
Registered electors		88,365		
Majority		4,364	5.90	▼21.06
BN hold		Swing		
Source(s) "His Majesty's Government Gazette - Notice of Contested Election, Parliament for the State of Negeri Sembilan [P.U. (B) 242/2018]" (PDF). Attorney General's Chambers of Malaysia. 3 May 2018. "Federal Government Gazette - Results of Contested Election and Statements of the Poll after the Official Addition of Votes, Parliamentary Constituencies for the State of Negeri Sembilan [P.U. (B) 316/2018]" (PDF). Attorney General's Chambers of Malaysia. 28 May 2018.

Malaysian general election, 2013
Party	Candidate	Votes	%	∆%
BN	Khairy Jamaluddin Abu Bakar	43,053	63.24	▲7.17
PKR	Radzali A. Ghani	24,696	36.28	▼7.65
Independent	Abdul Aziz Hassan	325	0.48	▲0.48
Total valid votes		68,074	100.00	
Total rejected ballots		1,217		
Unreturned ballots		257		
Turnout		69,548	87.30	▼9.55
Registered electors		79,661		
Majority		18,357	26.96	▲14.82
BN hold		Swing		
Source(s) "Federal Government Gazette - Notice of Contested Election, Parliament for the State of Negeri Sembilan [P.U. (B) 179/2013]" (PDF). Attorney General's Chambers of Malaysia. 26 April 2013. Archived from the original (PDF) on 2019-12-29. "Federal Government Gazette - Results of Contested Election and Statements of the Poll after the Official Addition of Votes, Parliamentary Constituencies for the State of Negeri Sembilan [P.U. (B) 220/2013]" (PDF). Attorney General's Chambers of Malaysia. 22 May 2013.

Malaysian general election, 2008
Party	Candidate	Votes	%	∆%
BN	Khairy Jamaluddin Abu Bakar	26,525	56.07	▼18.05
PKR	Badrul Hisham Shaharin	20,779	43.93	▲43.93
Total valid votes		47,304	100.00	
Total rejected ballots		1,086		
Unreturned ballots		511		
Turnout		48,901	77.75	▲3.29
Registered electors		62,896		
Majority		5,746	12.14	▼36.10
BN hold		Swing		

Malaysian general election, 2004
Party	Candidate	Votes	%
BN	Firdaus Muhammad Rom Harun	28,664	74.12
PAS	Dzulkefly Ahmad	10,008	25.88
Total valid votes		38,672	100.00
Total rejected ballots		1,114	
Unreturned ballots		80	
Turnout		39,866	74.46
Registered electors		53,540	
Majority		18,656	48.24
This was a new constituency created.
