= Mk Ibrahim Abdul Rahman =

Malaysian politician

Yang Berhormat Dato' Mk Ibrahim Abd Rahman DPNS DBNS
- مك إبراهيم عبدالرحمٰن

Speaker of the Negeri Sembilan State Legislative Assembly
- In office 26 September 2023 – 18 August 2026
- Monarch: Muhriz
- Menteri Besar: Aminuddin Harun (2023–2026); Ismail Lasim (2–18 August 2026)
- Deputy: Mohd Asna Amin
- Preceded by: Zulkefly Mohamad Omar
- Succeeded by: Awaludin Said
- Constituency: Non-MLA

State Chairman of the National Trust Party of Negeri Sembilan
- Incumbent
- Assumed office 17 November 2019
- President: Mohamad Sabu
- Deputy: Muhammad Zaki Md Sabri
- Preceded by: Zulkefly Mohamad Omar

Personal details
- Born: Mk Ibrahim bin Abd Rahman Negeri Sembilan, Malaysia
- Party: Malaysian Islamic Party (PAS) (until 2015); National Trust Party (AMANAH) (since 2015)
- Other political affiliations: Pakatan Rakyat (PR) (2008–2015); Pakatan Harapan (PH) (since 2015)
- Education: St. David's High School, Malacca & Raffles Institution
- Alma mater: Swansea University
- Occupation: Politician

Mk Ibrahim bin Abd Rahman is a Malaysian politician who served as Speaker of the Negeri Sembilan State Legislative Assembly from September 2023 to August 2026. He served as Member of the Seremban City Council (MBS) from 2020 to 2023. He is a member of the National Trust Party (AMANAH), a component party of the Pakatan Harapan (PH) coalition and formerly a member of the Malaysian Islamic Party (PAS), a component party of formerly Pakatan Rakyat (PR) and Barisan Alternatif (BA) coalitions. He has also served as State Chairman of AMANAH of Negeri Sembilan since November 2019. He was State Vice Chairman of AMANAH of Negeri Sembilan before his promotion to the state chairmanship in November 2019. He also served as the State Commissioner of PAS of Negeri Sembilan from 1999 to 2001.

== Political career ==
=== Candidate for the Member of the Negeri Sembilan State Legislative Assembly (1999) ===
In the 1999 Negeri Sembilan state election, Mk Ibrahim made his electoral debut after being nominated by PAS to contest for the Ampangan state seat. He lost to Zakaria Nordin of Barisan Nasional (BN) by a minority of 1,940 votes. He then left PAS and mobilised the Gerakan Harapan Baru (GHB) of Negeri Sembilan, before joining AMANAH.

== Election results ==
Negeri Sembilan State Legislative Assembly
Year	Constituency	Candidate	Votes	Pct	Opponent(s)	Votes	Pct	Ballots cast	Majority	Turnout
1999	N21 Ampangan	Mk Ibrahim Abd Rahman (PAS)	5,458	42.19%	Zakaria Nordin (UMNO)	7,398	57.18%	12,937	1,940	72.49%
1999	N21 Ampangan	Mk Ibrahim Abd Rahman (PAS)	5,458	42.19%	Mohammad Abdullah (IND)	81	0.63%	12,937	1,940	72.49%

== Honours ==
- Negeri Sembilan
  - Knight Commander of the Order of Loyalty to Negeri Sembilan (DPNS) – Dato' (2025)
  - Knight of the Order of Loyal Service to Negeri Sembilan (DBNS) – Dato' (2021)
