= Mohd Asna Amin =

Malaysian politician and corporate member

Yang Berhormat Datuk Mohd Asna Amin DPSM MLA
- محمّد أسنى أمين
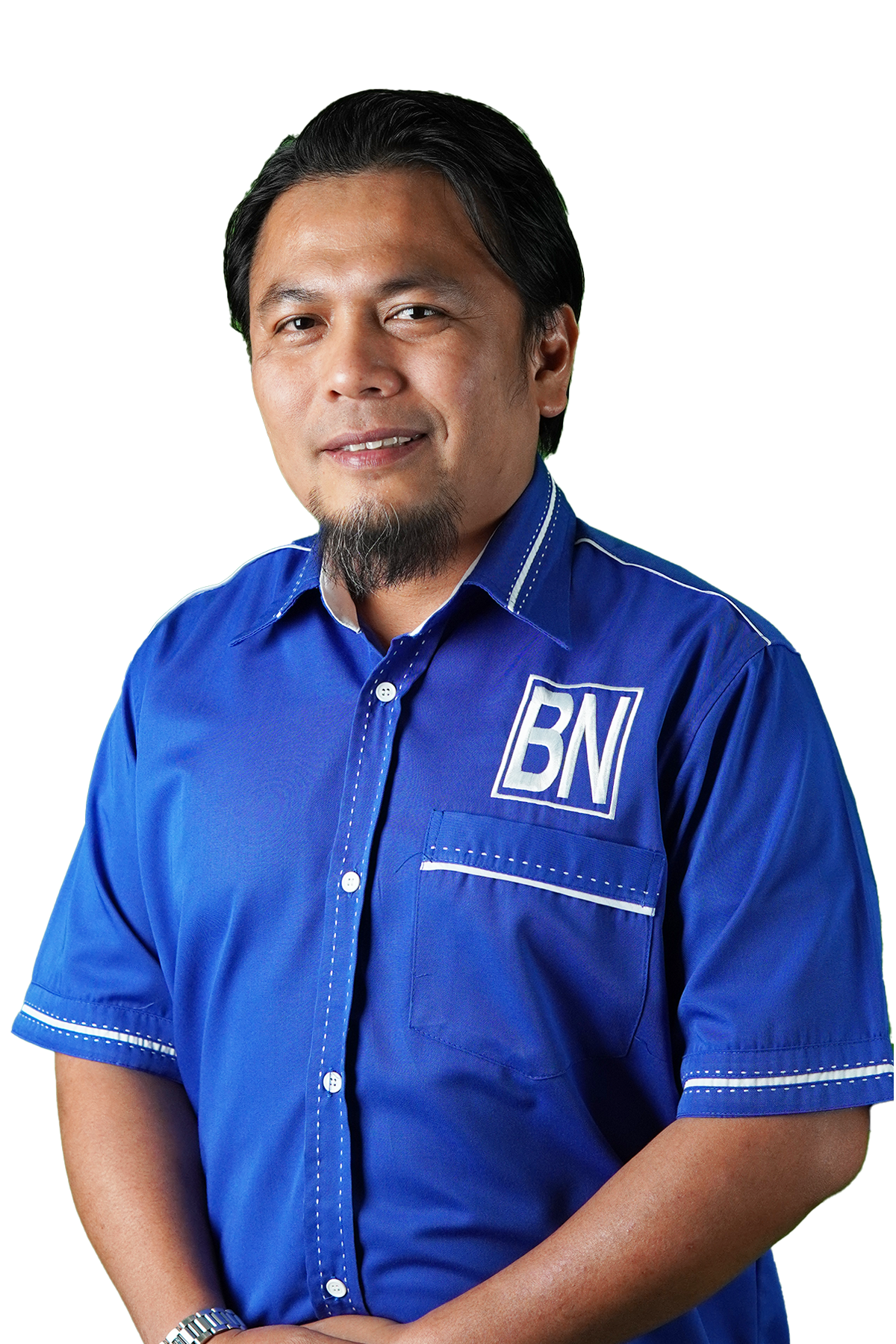

Deputy Speaker of the Negeri Sembilan State Legislative Assembly
- In office 4 August 2025 – 18 August 2026
- Monarch: Muhriz
- Menteri Besar: Aminuddin Harun
- Speaker: Mk Ibrahim Abdul Rahman
- Preceded by: Ravi Munusamy
- Succeeded by: Kamarol Ridzuan Mohd Zain
- Constituency: Lenggeng

Member of the Negeri Sembilan State Legislative Assembly for Lenggeng
- Incumbent
- Assumed office 12 August 2023
- Preceded by: Suhaimi Kassim (PH–AMANAH)
- Majority: 685 (2023); 9,994 (2026)

Personal details
- Born: Mohd Asna bin Amin; 2 June 1979 (age 47) Malaysia
- Party: United Malays National Organisation (UMNO)
- Other political affiliations: Barisan Nasional (BN)
- Education: University of Technology Malaysia (BEng)
- Occupation: Politician
- Profession: Corporate member

Mohd Asna bin Amin is a Malaysian politician and corporate member who has served as Member of the Negeri Sembilan State Legislative Assembly (MLA) for Lenggeng since August 2023. He served as the Deputy Speaker of the Negeri Sembilan State Legislative Assembly from August 2025 to August 2026. He is a member and the Vice Division Chief of Seremban of the United Malays National Organisation (UMNO), a component party of the Barisan Nasional (BN) coalition.

== Election results ==
Negeri Sembilan State Legislative Assembly
Year	Constituency	Candidate	Votes	Pct	Opponent(s)	Votes	Pct	Ballots cast	Majority	Turnout
2023	N09 Lenggeng	Mohd Asna Amin (UMNO)	10,040	50.71%	Mohd Fadli Che Me (PAS)	9,355	47.25%	20,014	685	73.08%
2023	N09 Lenggeng	Mohd Asna Amin (UMNO)	10,040	50.71%	Zul Azki Mat Sulop (IND)	404	2.04%	20,014	685	73.08%
2026	N09 Lenggeng	Mohd Asna Amin (UMNO)	15,960	71.65%	Zarinna Abu Zarin (AMANAH)	5,966	26.78%	22,275	9,994	77.13%
2026	N09 Lenggeng	Mohd Asna Amin (UMNO)	15,960	71.65%	Zool Amali Hussin (BERSATU)	349	1.57%	22,275	9,994	77.13%

== Honours ==
- Malacca
  - Companion Class II of the Exalted Order of Malacca (DPSM) – Datuk (2023)
