= Johol (state constituency) =

Political subdivision in Malaysia

Johol (N19)
Negeri Sembilan constituency

State constituency
- Legislature: Negeri Sembilan State Legislative Assembly
MLA
Saiful Yazan Sulaiman
BN
- Constituency created: 1959
- First contested: 1959
- Last contested: 2026

Demographics
- Electors (2023): 12,313

N19 Johol within Negeri Sembilan, as used for the 2023 and 2026 state elections

Johol is a state constituency in Negeri Sembilan, Malaysia, that has been represented in the Negeri Sembilan State Legislative Assembly.

The state constituency was first contested in 1959 and is mandated to return a single Assemblyman to the Negeri Sembilan State Legislative Assembly under the first-past-the-post voting system.

== Demographics ==
Ethnic breakdown of Johol's electorate as of 2026
1. Malay (73.7%)
2. Chinese (15.5%)
3. Other ethnicities (5.70%)
4. Indian (5.20%)

== History ==
=== Polling districts ===
According to the federal gazette issued on 23 July 2026, the Johol constituency is divided into 10 polling districts.

State constituency	Polling district	Code	Location
Johol（N19）	Kampong Kepis	129/19/01	SK Kepis
Johol（N19）	Malan Baru	129/19/02	SJK (C) Kg Baru Kepis
Johol（N19）	Dangi	129/19/03	SJK (C) Pei Chun Dangi
Johol（N19）	Kampung Selaru	129/19/04	SK Dangi
Johol（N19）	Inas	129/19/05	SK Inas
Johol（N19）	Kampong Padang Jual	129/19/06	Balai Raya Kampung Padang Jual Johol
Johol（N19）	Pekan Johol	129/19/07	SJK (C) Yuk Chai Johol
Johol（N19）	Kuala Johol	129/19/08	SK Undang Johol
Johol（N19）	Kampung Nuri	129/19/09	SMK Datuk Undang Abdul Manap
Johol（N19）	Ayer Mawang	129/19/10	SK Nuri

=== Representation history ===
Members of Assembly for Johol
Assembly	No	Years	Name	Party
Constituency created
1st	N02	1959-1964	Abu Kassim Saad	Alliance (UMNO)
2nd	N02	1964-1969	Sapiah Talib	Alliance (UMNO)
		1969-1971	Assembly dissolved	
3rd	N02	1971-1973	Sapiah Talib	Alliance (UMNO)
3rd	N02	1973-1974	Sapiah Talib	BN (UMNO)
4th	N16	1974-1978	Hamzah Yatim	BN (UMNO)
5th	N16	1978-1982	Hamzah Yatim	BN (UMNO)
6th	N16	1982-1986	Ishak Mohamed Yusof	BN (UMNO)
7th	N14	1986-1990	Darus Salim Bulin	BN (UMNO)
8th	N14	1990-1995	Darus Salim Bulin	BN (UMNO)
9th	N15	1995-1999	Darus Salim Bulin	BN (UMNO)
10th	N15	1999-2004	Darus Salim Bulin	BN (UMNO)
11th	N19	2004-2008	Roslan Mohd Yusof	BN (UMNO)
12th	N19	2008-2013	Roslan Mohd Yusof	BN (UMNO)
13th	N19	2013-2018	Abu Samah Mahat	BN (UMNO)
14th	N19	2018-2023	Saiful Yazan Sulaiman	BN (UMNO)
15th	N19	2023–2026	Saiful Yazan Sulaiman	BN (UMNO)
16th	N19	2026–present	Saiful Yazan Sulaiman	BN (UMNO)

== Election results ==
Negeri Sembilan state election, 2026
Party	Candidate	Votes	%	∆%
BN	Saiful Yazan Sulaiman	6,663	74.51	▲11.82
PH	Mohd Zailan Munawar	2,280	25.49	▲25.49
Total valid votes		8,943	100.00	
Total rejected ballots		109		
Unreturned ballots		10		
Turnout		9,062	73.49	▲5.17
Registered electors		12,331		
Majority		4,383	49.01	▲23.63
BN hold		Swing		

Negeri Sembilan state election, 2023
Party	Candidate	Votes	%	∆%
BN	Saiful Yazan Sulaiman	5,228	62.69	▲13.35
PN	Kamaruddin Mat Tahir	3,111	37.31	▲37.31
Total valid votes		8,339	100.00	
Total rejected ballots		66		
Unreturned ballots		7		
Turnout		8,412	68.32	▼14.08
Registered electors		12,313		
Majority		2,117	25.38	▲13.20
BN hold		Swing		

Negeri Sembilan state election, 2018
Party	Candidate	Votes	%	∆%
BN	Saiful Yazan Sulaiman	3,907	49.34	▼9.08
PH	Zulkefly Mohamad Omar	2,942	37.16	▲37.16
PAS	Kamaruddin Md Tahir	1,069	13.50	▼28.08
Total valid votes		7,918	100.00	
Total rejected ballots		230		
Unreturned ballots		2		
Turnout		8,150	82.40	▼2.22
Registered electors		9,891		
Majority		965	12.18	▼4.66
BN hold		Swing		

Negeri Sembilan state election, 2013
Party	Candidate	Votes	%	∆%
BN	Abu Samah Mahat	4,662	58.42	▼1.75
PAS	Nor Azman Mohamad	3,318	41.58	▲1.75
Total valid votes		7,980	100.00	
Total rejected ballots		190		
Unreturned ballots		22		
Turnout		8,192	84.62	▲10.23
Registered electors		9,681		
Majority		1,334	16.84	▼3.50
BN hold		Swing		

Negeri Sembilan state election, 2008
Party	Candidate	Votes	%	∆%
BN	Roslan Mohd Yusof	3,737	60.17	▼8.41
PAS	Kamarudin Md Tahir	2,474	39.83	▲8.41
Total valid votes		6,211	100.00	
Total rejected ballots		226		
Unreturned ballots		0		
Turnout		6,437	74.39	▲0.86
Registered electors		8,653		
Majority		1,263	20.33	▼16.82
BN hold		Swing		

Negeri Sembilan state election, 2004
Party	Candidate	Votes	%	∆%
BN	Roslan Md Yusof	4,354	68.58	▲11.52
PAS	Kamarudin Md Tahir	1,995	31.42	▼11.52
Total valid votes		6,349	100.00	
Total rejected ballots		189		
Unreturned ballots		0		
Turnout		6,538	73.54	▲3.91
Registered electors		8,891		
Majority		2,359	37.16	▲23.05
BN hold		Swing		

Negeri Sembilan state election, 1999
Party	Candidate	Votes	%	∆%
BN	Darus Salim Bulin	3,429	57.05	▼16.92
PAS	Rusli Idris	2,581	42.95	▲42.95
Total valid votes		6,010	100.00	
Total rejected ballots		257		
Unreturned ballots		10		
Turnout		6,277	69.62	▲0.28
Registered electors		9,016		
Majority		848	14.11	▼38.24
BN hold		Swing		

Negeri Sembilan state election, 1995
Party	Candidate	Votes	%	∆%
BN	Darus Salim Bulin	4,307	73.98	▲4.22
Independent	Rameli Dahalan	1,259	21.62	▲21.62
S46	Sued Husin	256	4.40	▼25.85
Total valid votes		5,822	100.00	
Total rejected ballots		241		
Unreturned ballots		19		
Turnout		6,082	69.34	▼5.21
Registered electors		8,771		
Majority		3,048	52.35	▲12.84
BN hold		Swing		

Negeri Sembilan state election, 1990
Party	Candidate	Votes	%	∆%
BN	Darus Salim Bulin	4,041	69.76	▲10.09
S46	Omar Othman	1,752	30.24	▲30.24
Total valid votes		5,793	100.00	
Total rejected ballots		346		
Unreturned ballots		2		
Turnout		6,141	74.55	▲3.73
Registered electors		8,237		
Majority		2,289	39.51	▲20.17
BN hold		Swing		

Negeri Sembilan state election, 1986
Party	Candidate	Votes	%	∆%
BN	Darus Salim Bulin	3,076	59.67	▼26.35
Independent	Rameli Dahalan	2,079	40.33	▲40.33
Total valid votes		5,155	100.00	
Total rejected ballots		393		
Unreturned ballots		0		
Turnout		5,548	70.83	▼3.75
Registered electors		7,833		
Majority		997	19.34	▼52.70
BN hold		Swing		

Negeri Sembilan state election, 1982
Party	Candidate	Votes	%	∆%
BN	Ishak Mohd. Yusof	4,332	86.02	▲31.39
PAS	Othman Hamzah	704	13.98	▲7.36
Total valid votes		5,036	100.00	
Total rejected ballots		299		
Unreturned ballots		0		
Turnout		5,335	74.57	▼6.53
Registered electors		7,154		
Majority		3,628	72.04	▲52.17
BN hold		Swing		

Negeri Sembilan state election, 1978
Party	Candidate	Votes	%	∆%
BN	Hamzah Yatim	2,717	54.64	
Independent	Sapiah binti Talib	1,729	34.77	
PAS	Othman D. Pg. Bachek	329	6.62	
DAP	Ahmad Talal Abdul Razim	198	3.98	
Total valid votes		4,973	100.00	
Total rejected ballots		309		
Unreturned ballots		0		
Turnout		5,282	81.10	▲81.10
Registered electors		6,513		
Majority		988	19.87	▲19.87
BN hold		Swing		

Negeri Sembilan state election, 1974
Party	Candidate	Votes	%	∆%
On the nomination day, Hamzah Yatim won uncontested.
BN	Hamzah Yatim			
Total valid votes				
Total rejected ballots				
Unreturned ballots				
Turnout				
Registered electors		5,819		
Majority				
BN gain from Alliance		Swing		-

Negeri Sembilan state election, 1969
Party	Candidate	Votes	%	∆%
Alliance	Sapiah binti Talib	2,800	64.04	▲8.96
PMIP	Ismail Tahat	1,572	35.96	▲31.96
Total valid votes		4,372	100.00	
Total rejected ballots		402		
Unreturned ballots		0		
Turnout		4,774	77.44	▼5.24
Registered electors		6,165		
Majority		1,228	28.09	▼3.44
Alliance hold		Swing		

Negeri Sembilan state election, 1964
Party	Candidate	Votes	%	∆%
Alliance	Sapiah binti Talib	2,535	55.08	▼3.89
Independent	Harun Mulop	1,084	23.55	▼6.70
Socialist Front	Tan Fot Lan	660	14.34	▲14.34
PMIP	H. Ondot Jimak	184	4.00	▼6.78
UDP	Anthony Lim Joo Hoa	139	3.02	▲3.02
Total valid votes		4,602	100.00	
Total rejected ballots		323		
Unreturned ballots		0		
Turnout		4,925	82.68	▲4.29
Registered electors		5,957		
Majority		1,451	31.53	▲2.81
Alliance hold		Swing		

Negeri Sembilan state election, 1959
Party	Candidate	Votes	%
Alliance	Abu Kasim Saad	2,392	58.97
Independent	Gan Eng Kwee	1,227	30.25
PMIP	A. Ghani A. Samad	437	10.77
Total valid votes		4,056	100.00
Total rejected ballots		175	
Unreturned ballots		0	
Turnout		4,231	78.38
Registered electors		5,398	
Majority		1,165	28.72
This was a new constituency created.
