= Abu Samah Mahat =

Malaysian politician

Yang Berbahagia Dato' Abu Samah Mahat DPNS DNS ANS

Member of the Negeri Sembilan State Legislative Assembly for Johol
- In office 5 May 2013 – 9 May 2018
- Preceded by: Roslan Md. Yusof (BN–UMNO)
- Succeeded by: Saiful Yazan Sulaiman (BN–UMNO)
- Majority: 1,344 (2013)

Personal details
- Party: United Malays National Organisation (UMNO)
- Other political affiliations: Barisan Nasional (BN)
- Occupation: Politician

Abu Samah bin Mahat is a Malaysian politician who served as Member of Legislative Assembly for Johol from 2013 to 2018. He was a member of United Malays National Organisation (UMNO), a component party of Barisan Nasional (BN).

== Election results ==
Negeri Sembilan State Legislative Assembly
Year	Constituency	Candidate	Votes	Pct	Opponent(s)	Votes	Pct	Ballots cast	Majority	Turnout
2013	N19 Johol	Abu Samah Mahat (UMNO)	4,662	58.42%	Nor Azman Mohamad (PAS)	3,318	41.58%	8,170	1,344	84.40%

== Honours ==
- Negeri Sembilan
  - Knight Commander of the Order of Loyalty to Negeri Sembilan (DPNS) – Dato' (2018)
  - Companion of the Order of Loyalty to Negeri Sembilan (DNS) (2011)
  - Member of the Order of Loyalty to Negeri Sembilan (ANS) (2010)
