= 2009 Bagan Pinang by-election =

Election in Malaysia

← 2008	11 October 2009	2013 →

Bagan Pinang seat in the Negeri Sembilan State Legislative Assembly
	BN	PAS
Candidate	Mohd Isa Abdul Samad	Zulkefly Mohamad Omar
Party	BN (UMNO)	PAS
Alliance		PR
Popular vote	8,013	2,578
Percentage	75.66%	24.34%
Bagan Pinang assemblyman before election
Azman Mohd Noor
BN (UMNO)
Elected Bagan Pinang assemblyman
Mohd Isa Abdul Samad
BN (UMNO)

The 2009 Bagan Pinang by-election is a by-election for the Negeri Sembilan State Legislative Assembly state seat of Bagan Pinang, Malaysia that were held on 14 July 2009. It was called following the death of the incumbent, Azman Mohd Noor on 22 May 2009.

== Background ==
Azman Mohd Noor, from United Malays National Organization (UMNO), were elected to the Negeri Sembilan State Legislative Assembly state seat of Bagan Pinang at the 2008 Negeri Sembilan state election, winning the seat in his first attempt as a Barisan Nasional (BN) candidate. Azman was also vice-chief of UMNO Teluk Kemang division.

On 4 September 2009, Azman died at Seremban Hospital after suffering a heart attack. His death means that Bagan Pinang state seat were vacated. This necessitates for by-election to be held, as the seat were vacated more that 2 years before the expiry of Negeri Sembilan assembly current term. Election Commission of Malaysia (SPR) announced on 14 September 2009 that the by-election for the seat will be held on 11 October 2009, with 3 October 2009 set as the nomination day.

== Nomination and campaign ==
After nomination closed, it was confirmed that BN will face PAS in a straight fight for the Bagan Pinang seat. BN nominated Mohd Isa Abdul Samad, the former Menteri Besar of Negeri Sembilan who held the longest term from 1982 to 2004 (22 years), former assemblyman for Linggi for the same period, and UMNO's Teluk Kemang division chief. PAS meanwhile nominated Zulkefly Mohamad Omar, the party's Negeri Sembilan state commissioner.

== Timeline ==
The key dates are listed below.

Date	Event
	Issue of the Writ of Election
3 October 2009	Nomination Day
3–10 October 2009	Campaigning Period
	Early polling day for postal and overseas voters
11 October 2009	Polling Day

== Results ==
Negeri Sembilan state by-election, 11 October 2009: Bagan Pinang The by-election was called due to the death of incumbent, Azman Mohd Noor.
Party	Candidate	Votes	%	∆%
BN	Mohd Isa Abdul Samad	8,013	75.66	▲14.58
PAS	Zulkefly Mohamad Omar	2,578	24.34	▼14.58
Total valid votes		10,591	100.00	
Total rejected ballots		223		
Unreturned ballots		356		
Turnout		11,170	81.75	▲0.16
Registered electors		13,664		
Majority		5,435	51.32	▲29.16
BN hold		Swing		
Source(s) "Pilihan Raya Kecil N.31 Bagan Pinang". Election Commission of Malaysia.

=== Previous results ===
Negeri Sembilan state election, 2008: Bagan Pinang
Party	Candidate	Votes	%	∆%
BN	Azman Mohd Noor	6,430	61.08	▼18.23
PAS	Ramli Ismail	4,097	38.92	▲18.23
Total valid votes		10,527	100.00	
Total rejected ballots		384		
Unreturned ballots		668		
Turnout		11,579	81.59	▲10.00
Registered electors		14,192		
Majority		2,333	22.16	▼36.46
BN hold		Swing		

== Aftermath ==
Muhyiddin Yassin, Deputy Prime Minister of Malaysia and UMNO's deputy president, said after BN's victory that the Bagan Pinang win shows BN is making a comeback after losing on all by-elections since the 2008 Malaysian general election except the 2009 Batang Air by-election.
