= Suhaimi Aini =

Malaysian politician

Yang Berhormat Tuan Suhaimi Aini ANS PJK MLA

Member of the Negeri Sembilan State Legislative Assembly for Kota
- Incumbent
- Assumed office 12 August 2023
- Preceded by: Awaludin Said (BN–UMNO)
- Majority: 135 (2023)

Personal details
- Party: United Malays National Organisation (UMNO)
- Other political affiliations: Barisan Nasional (BN)
- Occupation: Politician

Suhaimi bin Aini is a Malaysian politician who served as Member of the Sembilan Legislative Assembly for Kota since August 2023.

== Election results ==
Negeri Sembilan State Legislative Assembly
Year	Constituency	Candidate	Votes	Pct	Opponent(s)	Votes	Pct	Ballots cast	Majority	Turnout
2023	N28 Kota	Suhaimi Aini (UMNO)	5,869	50.58%	Ahmad Shukri Abdul Shukor (BERSATU)	5,734	49.42%	11,723	135	71.01%

== Honours ==
- Negeri Sembilan
  - Member of the Order of Loyalty to Negeri Sembilan (ANS) (2025)
  - Recipient of the Meritorious Service Medal (PJK) (2015)
