= Mohamad Hasan (politician) =

Malaysian politician (born 1956)

Yang Berhormat Dato' Seri Utama Mohamad Hasan PSD SPNS DSSA MP MLA
- محمد حسن
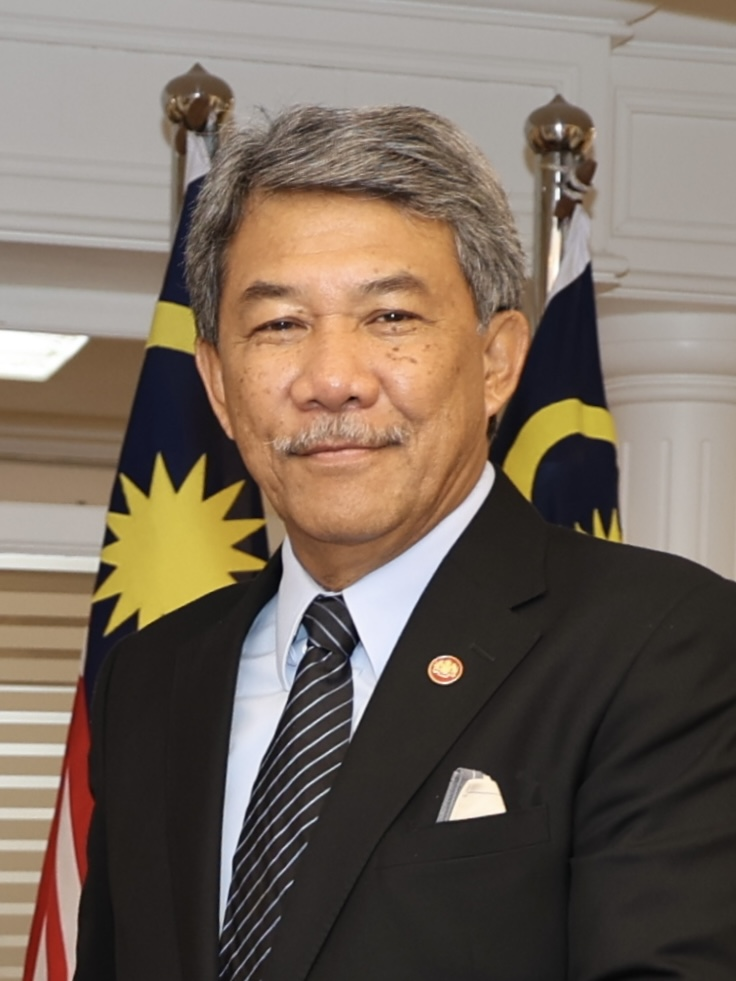
- Mohamad in 2023

Minister of Foreign Affairs
- Incumbent
- Assumed office 12 December 2023
- Monarchs: Abdullah (2023–2024); Ibrahim (since 2024)
- Prime Minister: Anwar Ibrahim
- Deputy: Mohamad Alamin (2023–2025); Lukanisman Awang Sauni (since 2025)
- Preceded by: Zambry Abdul Kadir
- Constituency: Rembau

Minister of Defence
- In office 3 December 2022 – 12 December 2023
- Monarch: Abdullah
- Prime Minister: Anwar Ibrahim
- Deputy: Adly Zahari
- Preceded by: Hishammuddin Hussein
- Succeeded by: Mohamed Khaled Nordin
- Constituency: Rembau

Member of the Malaysian Parliament for Rembau
- Incumbent
- Assumed office 19 November 2022
- Preceded by: Khairy Jamaluddin (BN–UMNO)
- Majority: 19,897 (2022)

State Leader of the Opposition of Negeri Sembilan
- In office 13 April 2019 – 1 July 2023
- Monarch: Muhriz
- Menteri Besar: Aminuddin Harun
- Preceded by: Himself
- Succeeded by: Ridzuan Ahmad
- In office 2 July 2018 – 18 February 2019
- Monarch: Muhriz
- Menteri Besar: Aminuddin Harun
- Preceded by: Anthony Loke Siew Fook
- Succeeded by: Himself

Member of the Negeri Sembilan State Legislative Assembly for Rantau
- Incumbent
- Assumed office 13 April 2019
- Preceded by: Himself (BN–UMNO)
- Majority: 4,510 (2019); 10,280 (2023) 19,050 (2026)
- In office 21 March 2004 – 18 February 2019
- Preceded by: Abdul Ghani Hassan (BN–UMNO)
- Succeeded by: Himself (BN–UMNO)
- Majority: 6,199 (2004); 3,783 (2008); 4,613 (2013); Walkover (2018)

7th Menteri Besar of Negeri Sembilan
- In office 25 March 2004 – 10 May 2018
- Monarchs: Ja'afar (2004–2008); Muhriz (2008–2018)
- Preceded by: Mohd Isa Abdul Samad
- Succeeded by: Aminuddin Harun
- Constituency: Rantau

Deputy Chairman of Barisan Nasional (Acting Chairman: 18 December 2018 – 30 June 2019)
- Incumbent
- Assumed office 30 June 2018
- Chairman: Ahmad Zahid Hamidi
- Preceded by: Hishammuddin Hussein (Acting)

Deputy President of the United Malays National Organisation (Acting President: 18 December 2018 – 30 June 2019)
- Incumbent
- Assumed office 30 June 2018
- President: Ahmad Zahid Hamidi
- Preceded by: Hishammuddin Hussein (Acting)

Personal details
- Born: Mohamad bin Hasan; 2 May 1956 (age 70) Rantau, Seremban, Negeri Sembilan, Federation of Malaya (now Malaysia)
- Citizenship: Malaysia
- Party: United Malays National Organisation (UMNO)
- Other political affiliations: Barisan Nasional (BN)
- Spouse: Raja Salbiah Tengku Najumuddin
- Children: 5
- Education: University of Malaya (BA)
- Occupation: Politician
- Profession: Corporate member
- Nickname: Tok Mat

Mohamad bin Hasan (Jawi: محمد بن حسن; born 2 May 1956), also commonly known as Tok Mat or Mat Hasan, is a Malaysian politician who has served as the Minister of Foreign Affairs under Prime Minister Anwar Ibrahim since 2023, and was previously the Minister of Defence.

He also serves as the Member of Parliament (MP) for Rembau and Member of the Negeri Sembilan State Legislative Assembly (MLA) for Rantau. He previously served as the seventh Menteri Besar of Negeri Sembilan from 2004 to 2018 and was that state's Leader of the Opposition between 2018 and 2023.

A member of the United Malays National Organisation (UMNO), he has been its deputy president since 2018, and is also the deputy chairman of the Barisan Nasional (BN) coalition.

== Early life and education ==
Mohamad was born in Kampung Kundur Hilir, Rantau, Seremban, Negeri Sembilan, on 2 May 1956. He received his early education at Sekolah Kebangsaan Datuk Akhir Zaman, Rantau, and continued his secondary education at Sekolah Menengah Kebangsaan Rantau. After completing secondary education, he went to Form 6 at Tuanku Ampuan Durah Secondary School, Seremban, and later pursued his undergraduate degree in International Relations at the University of Malaya (UM) in 1975.

== Corporate career ==
Mohamad started his career with Malayan Banking Berhad as a trainee officer. His last position with Maybank was assistant branch manager at the Petaling Jaya main branch before joining Arab Malaysia Merchant Bank. His last position with Arab Malaysian Merchant Bank was Manager at their Johor Bahru branch. Mohamad later moved to Bank Bumiputera Malaysia Berhad, and had served as General Manager of Bank Bumiputera London (1988–1992). After the banking world, he moved to the corporate sector as chief executive officer of Cold Storage Malaysia Berhad (1992–1994). His last position in the corporate sector was as managing director of Cycle and Carriage Bintang Berhad (1994–2004).

In addition, Mohamad was also a member of the Board of Directors of Khazanah Nasional Berhad, as well as Chairman of the FIMA Berhad Group, as well as the Board of Directors of Sepang International Circuit (SIC).

== Political career ==
=== Menteri besar of Negeri Sembilan ===
Following Barisan Nasional's victory in the 2004 election in Negeri Sembilan, Mohamad was sworn in as Menteri Besar of Negeri Sembilan on 25 March 2004. He had also won the constituency of Rantau in that state's legislative assembly, and successfully defended in the 2008 and 2013 elections. Having initially won unopposed in 2018 after the Election Commission (EC) barred People's Justice Party (PKR)’s candidate Streram Sinnansamy from filing his nomination papers, a by-election was held following the Election Court's decision that Mohamad's victory was null and void, which he subsequently won.

During his term as Menteri Besar, the state's debt to the federal government was reduced from RM2 billion to RM700 million, and the state had a cash reserve of RM500 million by 2018. Mohamad subsequently touted himself as a "crisis manager".

Following the 2018 Malaysian general election, Mohamad was touted as a possible successor to UMNO president Ahmad Zahid Hamidi, and calls for him to replace Zahid persisted past the 2022 Malaysian general election. His candidacy was supported by Barisan Nasional's three other component parties: the Malaysian Chinese Association, the Malaysian Indian Congress, and the United Sabah People's Party, as well as elements within UMNO involving Mohamad himself. However, he later switched his support to Zahid.

Furthermore, after the UMNO and BN's defeat in Negeri Sembilan in the 2018 election, the incoming Pakatan Harapan (PH) state government publicly praised Mohamad's administration. Mohamad was the state leader of the opposition from 2 July 2018 until 1 July 2023.

Mohamad is also the Rembau UMNO Division Chief, an UMNO Supreme Council Member and UMNO Deputy President. Mohamad was Acting President of UMNO during Ahmad Zahid Hamidi's six-month garden leave from 19 December 2018 to 30 June 2019.

=== Minister of Defence ===
On 2 December 2022, Prime Minister Anwar Ibrahim announced his cabinet. Mohamad was appointed to lead the Ministry of Defence.

=== Minister of Foreign Affairs ===
In the 2023 cabinet reshuffle, three former UMNO Menteri Besar exchanged portfolios between each other. Mohamad took over the Ministry of Foreign Affairs from Zambry Abdul Kadir. Zambry took over Ministry of Higher Education from Mohamed Khaled Nordin. Khaled took over the Ministry of Defence from Mohamad.

== Election results ==
Negeri Sembilan State Legislative Assembly
Year	Constituency	Candidate	Votes	Pct	Opponent(s)	Votes	Pct	Ballots cast	Majority	Turnout
2004	N27 Rantau	Mohamad Hasan (UMNO)	8,031	79.30%	Badrul Hisham Shaharin (PKR)	1,832	18.09%	10,127	6,199	72.77%
2008	N27 Rantau	Mohamad Hasan (UMNO)	7,739	66.17%	Aisah Lamsah (PKR)	3,956	33.83%	12,216	3,783	80.77%
2013	N27 Rantau	Mohamad Hasan (UMNO)	10,126	64.75%	Aisah Lamsah (PKR)	5,513	35.25%	15,878	4,613	87.09%
2018	N27 Rantau	Mohamad Hasan (UMNO) ^{1}	Unopposed							
2019	N27 Rantau	Mohamad Hasan (UMNO)	10,397	63.22%	Streram Sinnansamy (PKR)	5,887	35.80%	16,446	4,510	79.30%
2019	N27 Rantau	Mohamad Hasan (UMNO)	10,397	63.22%	Malar Rajaram (IND)	83	0.50%	16,446	4,510	79.30%
2019	N27 Rantau	Mohamad Hasan (UMNO)	10,397	63.22%	Mohd Nor Yassin (IND)	79	0.48%	16,446	4,510	79.30%
2023	N27 Rantau	Mohamad Hasan (UMNO)	16,957	71.75%	Rozmal Malakan (PAS)	6,677	28.25%	23,634	10,280	71.86%
2026	N27 Rantau	Mohamad Hasan (UMNO)	19,050	73.04%	Azizul Hakim Mahdi (PKR)	7,032	26.96%	26,082	12,018	74.88%

Note: ^{1} The Election Court has on the 16 September 2018, passed a ruling that Mohamad Hasan had not been duly elected and a fresh by-election was called to be held after Mohamad Hasan's appeal was dismissed by the Federal Court on 18 February 2019.

Parliament of Malaysia
Year	Constituency	Candidate	Votes	Pct	Opponent(s)	Votes	Pct	Ballots cast	Majority	Turnout
2022	P131 Rembau	Mohamad Hasan (UMNO)	53,075	48.50%	Jufitri Joha (PKR)	33,178	30.32%	109,436	19,897	81.94%
2022	P131 Rembau	Mohamad Hasan (UMNO)	53,075	48.50%	Mohd Nazree Mohd Yunus (BERSATU)	21,875	19.99%	109,436	19,897	81.94%
2022	P131 Rembau	Mohamad Hasan (UMNO)	53,075	48.50%	Ramly Awalludin (PEJUANG)	529	0.48%	109,436	19,897	81.94%
2022	P131 Rembau	Mohamad Hasan (UMNO)	53,075	48.50%	Tinagaram Subramaniam (PSM)	779	0.71%	109,436	19,897	81.94%

== Honours ==
=== Honours of Malaysia ===
- Malaysia
  - Commander of the Order of Loyalty to the Royal Family of Malaysia (PSD) – Datuk (1999)
  - Recipient of the 13th Yang di-Pertuan Agong Installation Medal
  - Recipient of the 14th Yang di-Pertuan Agong Installation Medal
  - Recipient of the 15th Yang di-Pertuan Agong Installation Medal
  - Recipient of the 17th Yang di-Pertuan Agong Installation Medal
- Negeri Sembilan
  - Knight Grand Commander of the Order of Loyalty to Negeri Sembilan (SPNS) – Dato' Seri Utama (2004)
  - Knight Companion of the Order of Loyalty to Negeri Sembilan (DSNS) – Dato' (2002)
  - Member of the Order of Loyalty to Negeri Sembilan (ANS)
- Selangor
  - Knight Companion of the Order of Sultan Salahuddin Abdul Aziz Shah (DSSA) – Dato' (1999)

== See also ==
- Rantau (state constituency)
- 2019 Rantau by-election

Political offices
Preceded by Mohd Isa Abdul Samad	10th Menteri Besar of Negeri Sembilan; 2004 - 2018	Succeeded by Aminuddin Harun
Preceded by Anthony Loke Siew Fook	Leader of the Opposition of Negeri Sembilan; 2018 - present	Incumbent
