= Rantau (state constituency) =

State constituency in Negeri Sembilan, Malaysia

Rantau (N27)
Negeri Sembilan constituency

State constituency
- Legislature: Negeri Sembilan State Legislative Assembly
MLA
Mohamad Hasan (politician)
BN
- Constituency created: 1959
- First contested: 1959
- Last contested: 2023

Demographics
- Electors (2023): 32,890

N27 Rantau within Negeri Sembilan, as used for the 2023 and 2026 state elections

Rantau is a state constituency in Negeri Sembilan, Malaysia, that has been represented in the Negeri Sembilan State Legislative Assembly.

The state constituency was first contested in 1959 and is mandated to return a single Assemblyman to the Negeri Sembilan State Legislative Assembly under the first-past-the-post voting system.

== Demographics ==
Ethnic breakdown of Rantau's electorate as of 2026
1. Malay (56.1%)
2. Indian (27.0%)
3. Chinese (15.3%)
4. Other ethnicities (1.60%)

== History ==
=== Polling districts ===
According to the gazette issued on 23 July 2026, the Rantau constituency has a total of 14 polling districts.

State constituency	Polling districts	Code	Location
Rantau (N27)	Kampong Sendayan	131/27/01	SMK Bandar Baru Seri Sendayan
Rantau (N27)	Sendayan	131/27/02	SK Sri Sendayan; SK Sendayan
Rantau (N27)	Taman Kelab Tuanku	131/27/03	SMK Mambau
Rantau (N27)	Kampong Mambau	131/27/04	SK Mambau
Rantau (N27)	Kampong Bemban	131/27/05	SJK (T) Ladang Shanghai Seremban
Rantau (N27)	Kuala Sawah	131/27/06	SK Nyatoh
Rantau (N27)	Kampong Sri Lalang	131/27/07	SK Datuk Akhir Zaman
Rantau (N27)	Kampong Sega	131/27/08	SK Sega
Rantau (N27)	Pekan Sagga	131/27/09	SJK (T) Ldg Sagga
Rantau (N27)	Rantau	131/27/10	SJK (C) Chung Hua Rantau; Kompleks Sukan Komuniti Rantau
Rantau (N27)	Linsum	131/27/11	SK Dato' Raja Melana
Rantau (N27)	Kampong Siliau	131/27/12	SK Seliau
Rantau (N27)	Angsa Emas	131/27/13	Dewan Orang Ramai Taman Angsamas
Rantau (N27)	Bandar Ekar	132/27/14	SJK (T) Rantau

=== Representation history ===
Members of the Legislative Assembly for Rantau
Assembly	No	Years	Member	Party
Constituency created
1st	N05	1959-1964	Gurnam Singh Gill	Socialist Front (Lab)
2nd	N05	1964-1969	Ayakannu Vallisamy	Alliance (MIC)
		1969-1971	Assembly was dissolved	
3rd	N05	1971-1973	S. V. Veloo	Alliance (MIC)
3rd	N05	1973-1974	S. V. Veloo	BN (MIC)
4th	N08	1974-1978	Sheikh Mohamed Hamid Mohamed Said	BN (UMNO)
5th	N08	1978-1982	Sheikh Mohamed Hamid Mohamed Said	BN (UMNO)
6th	N08	1982-1986	Ismail Lebai Kamat	BN (UMNO)
7th	N24	1986-1990	Muthu Palaniappan	BN (MIC)
8th	N24	1990-1995	Muthu Palaniappan	BN (MIC)
9th	N27	1995-1999	Hamdan Mohamad	BN (UMNO)
10th	N27	1999-2004	Ab. Ghani Hassan	BN (UMNO)
11th	N27	2004-2008	Mohamad Hasan	BN (UMNO)
12th	N27	2008-2013	Mohamad Hasan	BN (UMNO)
13th	N27	2013-2018	Mohamad Hasan	BN (UMNO)
14th	N27	2018-2023	Mohamad Hasan	BN (UMNO)
15th	N27	2023–2026	Mohamad Hasan	BN (UMNO)
16th	N27	2026–present	Mohamad Hasan	BN (UMNO)

== Election results ==
Negeri Sembilan state election, 2026
Party	Candidate	Votes	%	∆%
BN	Mohamad Hasan	19,050	73.04	▲1.29
PH	Azizul Hakim Mahdi	7,032	26.96	▲26.96
Total valid votes		26,082	100.00	
Total rejected ballots		268		
Unreturned ballots		31		
Turnout		26,381	75.74	▲3.27
Registered electors		34,831		
Majority		12,018	46.08	▲2.58
BN hold		Swing		

Negeri Sembilan state election, 2023
Party	Candidate	Votes	%	∆%
BN	Mohamad Hasan	16,957	71.75	▲8.53
PN	Rozmal Malakan	6,677	28.25	▲28.25
Total valid votes		23,634	100.00	
Total rejected ballots		161		
Unreturned ballots		39		
Turnout		23,834	72.47	▼6.84
Registered electors		32,890		
Majority		10,280	43.50	▲16.08
BN hold		Swing		

Negeri Sembilan state by-election, 2019 Upon the nullification of the incumbent, Mohamad Hasan
Party	Candidate	Votes	%
BN	Mohamad Hasan	10,397	63.22
PH	Streram Sinnasamy	5,887	35.80
Independent	Malar Rajaram	83	0.50
Independent	Mohd Nor Yassin	79	0.48
Total valid votes		16,446	
Total rejected ballots		146	
Unreturned ballots		4	
Turnout		16,596	79.31
Registered electors		20,926	
Majority		4,510	27.42
BN hold		Swing	

Negeri Sembilan state election, 2018
Party	Candidate	Votes	%	∆%
On Nomination Day, Mohamad Hasan won uncontested.
BN	Mohamad Hasan			
Total valid votes			100.00	
Total rejected ballots				
Unreturned ballots				
Turnout				
Registered electors		20,472		
Majority				
BN hold		Swing		

Negeri Sembilan state election, 2013
Party	Candidate	Votes	%	∆%
BN	Mohamad Hasan	10,126	64.75	▼1.42
PKR	Aisah Lamsah	5,513	35.25	▲1.42
Total valid votes		15,639	100.00	
Total rejected ballots		239		
Unreturned ballots		0		
Turnout		15,878	87.09	▲6.32
Registered electors		18,232		
Majority		4,613	29.50	▼2.84
BN hold		Swing		
Source(s) "Federal Government Gazette - Notice of Contested Election, State Legislative Assembly for the State of Negeri Sembilan [P.U. (B) 193/2013]" (PDF). Attorney General's Chambers of Malaysia. 26 April 2013. "Federal Government Gazette - Results of Contested Election and Statements of the Poll after the Official Addition of Votes, State Constituencies for the State of Negeri Sembilan [P.U. (B) 234/2013]" (PDF). Attorney General's Chambers of Malaysia. 22 May 2013.

Negeri Sembilan state election, 2008
Party	Candidate	Votes	%	∆%
BN	Mohamad Hasan	7,739	66.17	▼15.25
PKR	Aisah Lamsah	3,956	33.83	▲15.25
Total valid votes		11,695	100.00	
Total rejected ballots		271		
Unreturned ballots		250		
Turnout		12,216	80.77	▲8.00
Registered electors		15,124		
Majority		3,783	32.35	▼30.50
BN hold		Swing		

Negeri Sembilan state election, 2004
Party	Candidate	Votes	%	∆%
BN	Mohamad Hasan (Tok Mat)	8,031	81.43	▲17.11
PKR	Badrul Hisham Shaharin	1,832	18.57	▲18.57
Total valid votes		9,863	100.00	
Total rejected ballots		260		
Unreturned ballots		4		
Turnout		10,127	72.77	▼0.15
Registered electors		13,916		
Majority		6,199	62.85	▲34.22
BN hold		Swing		

Negeri Sembilan state election, 1999
Party	Candidate	Votes	%	∆%
BN	Ab Ghani Hassan	6,222	64.32	▼18.31
PKR	Husin Haroon	3,452	35.68	▲35.68
Total valid votes		9,674	100.00	
Total rejected ballots		299		
Unreturned ballots		22		
Turnout		9,995	72.92	▲0.16
Registered electors		13,706		
Majority		2,770	28.63	▼36.63
BN hold		Swing		

Negeri Sembilan state election, 1995
Party	Candidate	Votes	%	∆%
BN	Hamdan Mohamad	7,631	82.63	▲82.63
S46	Sukiman Tukimin	1,604	17.37	▲17.37
Total valid votes		9,235	100.00	
Total rejected ballots		393		
Unreturned ballots		27		
Turnout		9,655	72.77	▼0.15
Registered electors		13,268		
Majority		6,027	65.26	▲47.75
BN hold		Swing		

Negeri Sembilan state election, 1990
Party	Candidate	Votes	%	∆%
BN	Muthupalaniappan Muthuraman	4,849	58.75	▲6.35
All Malaysian Indian Progressive Front	P. Marimuthu	3,404	41.25	▲41.25
Total valid votes		8,253	100.00	
Total rejected ballots		292		
Unreturned ballots		1		
Turnout		8,546	72.92	▲1.38
Registered electors		11,720		
Majority		1,445	17.51	▼9.28
BN hold		Swing		

Negeri Sembilan state election, 1986
Party	Candidate	Votes	%	∆%
BN	Muthupalaniappan (Mani) Muthuraman	3,733	52.41	▲52.41
DAP	Palanisamy Subramaniam	1,825	25.62	▼0.46
Independent	Othman Abdullah	1,565	21.97	▲21.97
Total valid votes		7,123	100.00	
Total rejected ballots		296		
Unreturned ballots		0		
Turnout		7,419	71.54	▼5.42
Registered electors		10,371		
Majority		1,908	26.79	▼21.06
BN hold		Swing		

Negeri Sembilan state election, 1982
Party	Candidate	Votes	%	∆%
BN	Ismail Lebai Kamat	4,232	73.92	▲11.20
DAP	Yap Sin Kin	1,493	26.08	▼4.30
Total valid votes		5,725	100.00	
Total rejected ballots		124		
Unreturned ballots		0		
Turnout		5,849	76.96	▼2.14
Registered electors		7,600		
Majority		2,739	47.84	▲15.50
BN hold		Swing		

Negeri Sembilan state election, 1978
Party	Candidate	Votes	%	∆%
BN	Sheikh Md. Hamid Mohd. Said	3,291	62.72	▲0.33
DAP	V. Adidass	1,594	30.38	▲2.11
Independent	Mansor Pawi	362	6.90	▲6.90
Total valid votes		5,247	100.00	
Total rejected ballots		170		
Unreturned ballots		0		
Turnout		5,417	79.10	▼0.77
Registered electors		6,848		
Majority		1,697	32.34	▼1.78
BN hold		Swing		

Negeri Sembilan state election, 1974
Party	Candidate	Votes	%	∆%
BN	Sheikh Md. Hamid Mohd. Said	2,273	62.39	▲62.39
DAP	Raman Krishna Nair	1,030	28.27	▼14.30
Parti Sosialis Rakyat Malaysia	Mair Karistan @ Krishnan M. Appu	246	6.75	▲6.75
IPPP	V. Sinnathamby	94	2.58	▲2.58
Total valid votes		3,643	100.00	
Total rejected ballots		211		
Unreturned ballots		0		
Turnout		3,854	79.88	▲3.58
Registered electors		4,825		
Majority		1,243	34.12	▲21.42
BN gain from Alliance		Swing		-

Negeri Sembilan state election, 1969
Party	Candidate	Votes	%	∆%
Alliance	Veloo Saminathan	2,651	55.28	▼9.61
DAP	Mohd Shariff Harun	2,042	42.58	▲42.58
PCMB	Chan Ah Sui	103	2.15	▲2.15
Total valid votes		4,796	100.00	
Total rejected ballots		256		
Unreturned ballots		0		
Turnout		5,052	76.29	▼4.27
Registered electors		6,622		
Majority		609	12.70	▼26.42
Alliance hold		Swing		

Negeri Sembilan state election, 1964
Party	Candidate	Votes	%	∆%
Alliance	Ayakannu Vallisamy	3,226	64.88	▲64.88
Socialist Front	Rajaratnam Chellapah	1,281	25.76	▼17.74
UDP	Md. Nor Ab. Hamid	465	9.35	▲9.35
Total valid votes		4,972	100.00	
Total rejected ballots		229		
Unreturned ballots		0		
Turnout		5,201	80.56	▼0.28
Registered electors		6,456		
Majority		1,945	39.12	▲25.57
Alliance gain from Socialist Front		Swing		-

Negeri Sembilan state election, 1959
Party	Candidate	Votes	%
Socialist Front	Gurnam Singh Gill	1,682	43.51
Alliance	Sheikh Md. Hamid Mohd. Said	1,158	29.95
PMIP	Mohamed Hanifah Abdul Ghani	1,026	26.54
Total valid votes		3,866	100.00
Total rejected ballots		83	
Unreturned ballots		0	
Turnout		3,949	80.84
Registered electors		4,885	
Majority		524	13.55
This was a new constituency created.
