= IPPP =

IPPP may refer to:

- the National Football League's International Player Pathway Program
- in government procurement, an institutionalised Public-Private Partnership
