= Kota (state constituency) =

Political subdivision in Malaysia

Kota (N28)
Negeri Sembilan constituency

State constituency
- Legislature: Negeri Sembilan State Legislative Assembly
MLA
Suhaimi Aini
BN
- Constituency created: 1959
- First contested: 1959
- Last contested: 2026

Demographics
- Electors (2023): 16,510

N28 Kota within Negeri Sembilan, as used for the 2023 and 2026 state elections

Kota is a state constituency in Negeri Sembilan, Malaysia, that has been represented in the Negeri Sembilan State Legislative Assembly.

The state constituency was first contested in 1959 and is mandated to return a single Assemblyman to the Negeri Sembilan State Legislative Assembly under the first-past-the-post voting system.

== Demographics ==
Ethnic breakdown of Kota's electorate as of 2026
1. Malay (86.4%)
2. Chinese (6.30%)
3. Indian (5.20%)
4. Other ethnicities (2.10%)

== History ==
=== Polling districts ===
According to the gazette issued on 23 July 2026, the Kota constituency has a total of 15 polling districts.

State constituency	Polling districts	Code	Location
Kota (N28)	Kampong Batu	131/28/01	SK Kampong Batu
Kota (N28)	Selemak	131/28/02	SK Salak Nama
Kota (N28)	Kampong Bongek	131/28/03	SK Bongek
Kota (N28)	Kampong Chengkau Ulu	131/28/04	Balai Raya Chengkau Ulu Rantau; Tabika Kemas Kampung Chengkau Ulu
Kota (N28)	Kampong Gadong	131/28/05	SMA Haji Mohd. Yatim
Kota (N28)	Kampong Kendong	131/28/06	SK Kota
Kota (N28)	Kota	131/28/07	SJK (C) Pei Teck
Kota (N28)	Semerbok	131/28/08	SK Semerbok
Kota (N28)	Kampong Sawah Raja	131/28/09	SK Sawah Raja
Kota (N28)	Titian Bintangor	131/28/10	SK Dato Shah Bandar Rembau
Kota (N28)	Astana Raja	131/28/11	SK Astana Raja
Kota (N28)	Legong Ulu	131/28/12	SK Legong Ulu
Kota (N28)	Pekan Chengkau	131/28/13	SK Chengkau
Kota (N28)	Kampong Penajis	131/28/14	SK Tun Haji Abdul Malek
Kota (N28)	Kampong Pulau Mampat	131/28/15	SK Pulau Besar

=== Representation history ===
Members of the Legislative Assembly for Kota
Assembly	No	Years	Member	Party
Constituency created
1st	N09	1959-1964	Mohd. Yusof Abdullah	Alliance (UMNO)
2nd	N09	1964–1969	Mohd. Yusof Abdullah	Alliance (UMNO)
		1969-1971	Assembly was dissolved	
3rd	N09	1971-1973	Dahalan Amin	Alliance (UMNO)
3rd	N09	1973-1974	Dahalan Amin	BN (UMNO)
4th	N21	1974-1978	Dahalan Amin	BN (UMNO)
5th	N21	1978–1982	Dahalan Amin	BN (UMNO)
6th	N21	1982-1986	Ismail Yassin	BN (UMNO)
7th	N12	1986-1990	Ahmad Apandi Johan	BN (UMNO)
8th	N12	1990–1995	Ahmad Apandi Johan	BN (UMNO)
9th	N12	1995–1999	Ahmad Apandi Johan	BN (UMNO)
10th	N12	1999-2004	Zaharudin Mohd Shariff	BN (UMNO)
11th	N28	2004-2008	Awaludin Said	BN (UMNO)
12th	N28	2008–2013	Awaludin Said	BN (UMNO)
13th	N28	2013–2018	Awaludin Said	BN (UMNO)
14th	N28	2018–2023	Awaludin Said	BN (UMNO)
15th	N28	2023–2026	Suhaimi Aini	BN (UMNO)
16th	N28	2026–present	Suhaimi Aini	BN (UMNO)

== Election results ==
Negeri Sembilan state election, 2026
Party	Candidate	Votes	%	∆%
BN	Suhaimi Aini	10,177	78.58	▲28.00
PH	Mohd Alif Ibrahim	2,484	19.18	▲19.18
BERSATU	Akmal Noradzmi Abd Rahim	290	2.24	▲2.24
Total valid votes		12,951	100.00	
Total rejected ballots		122		
Unreturned ballots		11		
Turnout		13,084	78.14	▲7.13
Registered electors		16,744		
Majority		7,693	59.40	▼
BN hold		Swing		

Negeri Sembilan state election, 2023
Party	Candidate	Votes	%	∆%
BN	Suhaimi Aini	5,869	50.58	▼6.81
PN	Ahmad Shukri Abdul Shukur	5,734	49.42	▲49.42
Total valid votes		11,603	100.00	
Total rejected ballots		96		
Unreturned ballots		24		
Turnout		11,723	71.01	▼11.42
Registered electors		16,510		
Majority		135	1.16	▼25.65
BN hold		Swing		

Negeri Sembilan state election, 2018
Party	Candidate	Votes	%	∆%
BN	Awaludin Said	6,356	57.39	▼14.82
PH	Shahrizal Masrudin	3,387	30.58	▲30.58
PAS	Ishak Omar	1,333	12.04	▼15.75
Total valid votes		11,076	100.00	
Total rejected ballots		169		
Unreturned ballots		71		
Turnout		11,316	82.43	▼4.11
Registered electors		13,564		
Majority		2,969	26.81	▼17.61
BN hold		Swing		

Negeri Sembilan state election, 2013
Party	Candidate	Votes	%	∆%
BN	Awaludin Said	8,131	72.21	▲2.01
PAS	Ghazali Mohd Shom	3,129	27.79	▼2.01
Total valid votes		11,260	100.00	
Total rejected ballots		192		
Unreturned ballots		41		
Turnout		11,493	86.54	▲8.01
Registered electors		13,280		
Majority		5,002	44.42	▲4.02
BN hold		Swing		

Negeri Sembilan state election, 2008
Party	Candidate	Votes	%	∆%
BN	Awaludin Said	6,278	70.20	▼6.18
PAS	Azhar Ibrahim	2,665	29.80	▲6.18
Total valid votes		8,943	100.00	
Total rejected ballots		244		
Unreturned ballots		12		
Turnout		9,199	78.52	▲4.27
Registered electors		11,715		
Majority		3,613	40.40	▼12.37
BN hold		Swing		

Negeri Sembilan state election, 2004
Party	Candidate	Votes	%	∆%
BN	Awaludin Said	6,660	76.38	▲12.53
PAS	Zainal Jinin	2,059	23.62	▲23.62
Total valid votes		8,719	100.00	
Total rejected ballots		208		
Unreturned ballots		6		
Turnout		8,933	74.25	▲2.24
Registered electors		12,031		
Majority		4,601	52.77	▲25.05
BN hold		Swing		

Negeri Sembilan state election, 1999
Party	Candidate	Votes	%	∆%
BN	Zaharudin Mohd Shariff	4,444	63.86	▼24.33
PAS	Nasruddin Baba	2,515	36.14	▲36.14
Total valid votes		6,959	100.00	
Total rejected ballots		232		
Unreturned ballots		10		
Turnout		7,201	72.01	▲1.63
Registered electors		10,000		
Majority		1,929	27.72	▼48.66
BN hold		Swing		

Negeri Sembilan state election, 1995
Party	Candidate	Votes	%	∆%
BN	Ahmad Apandi Johan	5,937	88.19	▼1.07
PAS	Baharudin Ali	795	11.81	▲1.07
Total valid votes		6,732	100.00	
Total rejected ballots		228		
Unreturned ballots		13		
Turnout		6,973	70.38	▼4.30
Registered electors		9,908		
Majority		5,142	76.38	▼2.15
BN hold		Swing		

Negeri Sembilan state election, 1990
Party	Candidate	Votes	%	∆%
BN	Ahmad Apandi Johan	5,961	89.26	▲1.34
PAS	Shamsudin Dewa	717	10.74	▼1.34
Total valid votes		6,678	100.00	
Total rejected ballots		333		
Unreturned ballots		3		
Turnout		7,014	74.68	▲5.35
Registered electors		9,392		
Majority		5,244	78.53	▲2.67
BN hold		Swing		

Negeri Sembilan state election, 1986
Party	Candidate	Votes	%	∆%
BN	Ahmad Apandi Johan	5,244	87.93	▲4.49
PAS	Abas Ahmad	720	12.07	▼4.49
Total valid votes		5,964	100.00	
Total rejected ballots		237		
Unreturned ballots		0		
Turnout		6,201	69.33	▼7.77
Registered electors		8,944		
Majority		4,524	75.86	▲8.98
BN hold		Swing		

Negeri Sembilan state election, 1982
Party	Candidate	Votes	%	∆%
BN	Ismail Mohd. Yassin	5,773	83.44	▲9.17
PAS	Azhari Hamzah	1,146	16.56	▼9.17
Total valid votes		6,919	100.00	
Total rejected ballots		204		
Unreturned ballots		0		
Turnout		7,123	77.11	▼2.55
Registered electors		9,238		
Majority		4,627	66.87	▲18.34
BN hold		Swing		

Negeri Sembilan state election, 1978
Party	Candidate	Votes	%	∆%
BN	Dahalan Aman	4,852	74.27	▼3.04
PAS	Mahat Ishak	1,681	25.73	▲25.73
Total valid votes		6,533	100.00	
Total rejected ballots		432		
Unreturned ballots		0		
Turnout		6,965	79.65	▼1.43
Registered electors		8,744		
Majority		3,171	48.54	▼6.08
BN hold		Swing		

Negeri Sembilan state election, 1974
Party	Candidate	Votes	%	∆%
BN	Dahalan Aman	4,508	77.31	▲10.92
Independent	Shamsudin Dewa	1,323	22.69	▲22.69
Total valid votes		5,831	100.00	
Total rejected ballots		137		
Unreturned ballots		0		
Turnout		5,968	81.09	▼0.26
Registered electors		7,360		
Majority		3,185	54.62	▲21.84
BN gain from Alliance		Swing		-

Negeri Sembilan state election, 1969
Party	Candidate	Votes	%	∆%
Alliance	Dahalan Aman	3,291	66.39	▼1.50
PMIP	Mahat Ishak	1,666	33.61	▲33.61
Total valid votes		4,957	100.00	
Total rejected ballots		114		
Unreturned ballots		0		
Turnout		5,071	81.34	▼1.73
Registered electors		6,234		
Majority		1,625	32.78	▼10.00
Alliance hold		Swing		

Negeri Sembilan state election, 1964
Party	Candidate	Votes	%	∆%
Alliance	Mohd. Yusof Abdullah	3,263	67.89	▲14.87
UDP	Mohd Shariff Harun	1,207	25.11	▲25.11
Socialist Front	Ab Rahman Ali	336	6.99	▲6.99
Total valid votes		4,806	100.00	
Total rejected ballots		207		
Unreturned ballots		0		
Turnout		5,013	83.08	▼0.55
Registered electors		6,034		
Majority		2,056	42.78	▲33.52
Alliance hold		Swing		

Negeri Sembilan state election, 1959
Party	Candidate	Votes	%
Alliance	Mohd. Yusof Abdullah	2,320	53.03
National Party	Baba Ludek	1,915	43.77
PMIP	Noordin Abdul Samad	140	3.20
Total valid votes		4,375	100.00
Total rejected ballots		75	
Unreturned ballots		0	
Turnout		4,450	83.63
Registered electors		5,321	
Majority		405	9.26
This was a new constituency created.
