= 2018 Negeri Sembilan state election =

Malaysian state legislative election

- 9 May 2018

All 36 seats of the Negeri Sembilan State Legislative Assembly 19 seats needed for a majority
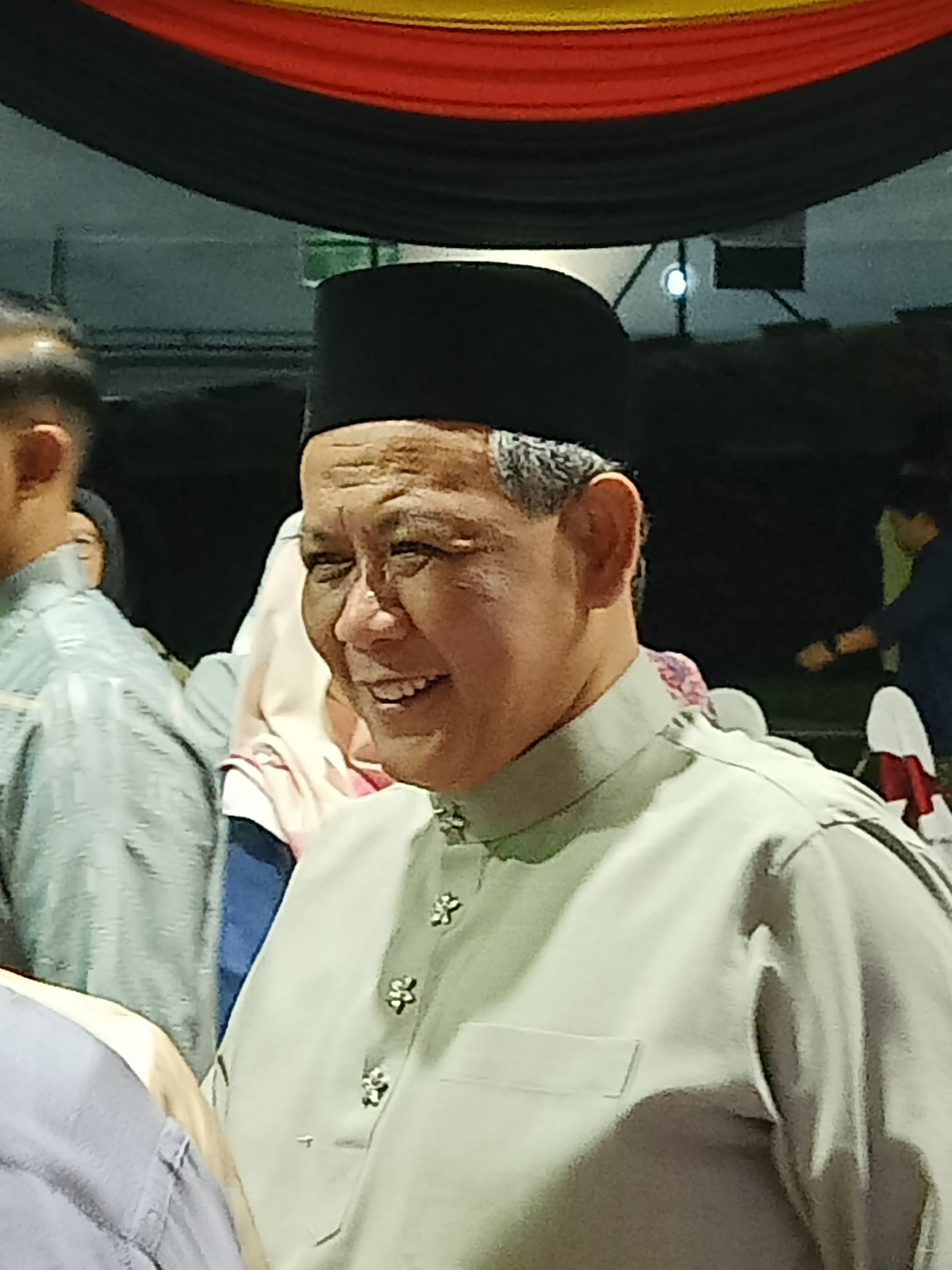

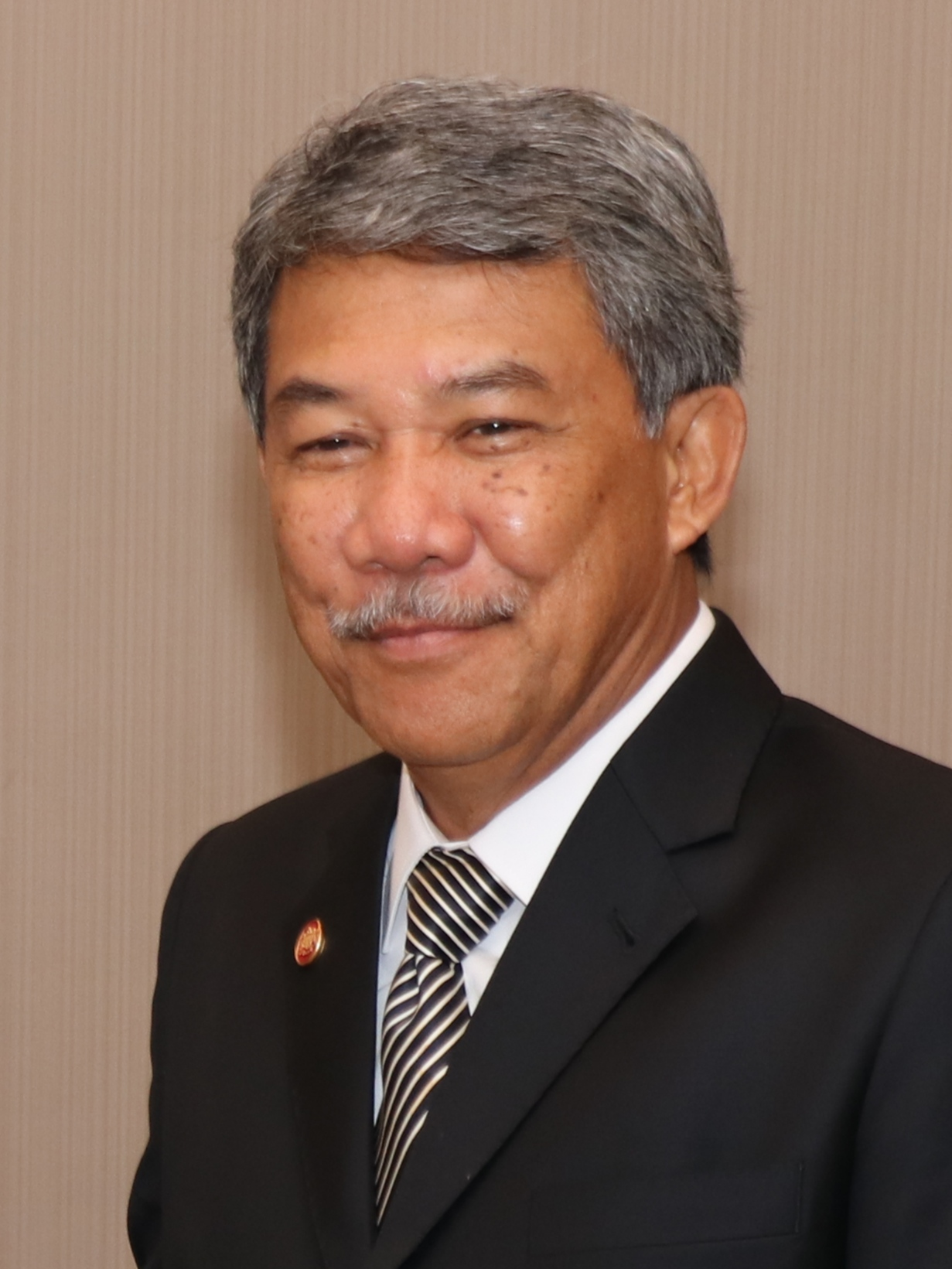
	Majority party	Minority party	Third party
			GS
Leader	Aminuddin Harun	Mohamad Hasan	Mustaffa Daharun
Party	Pakatan Harapan (PKR)	Barisan Nasional (UMNO)	Gagasan Sejahtera (PAS)
Leader since	30 August 2017	2004	Unknown
Leader's seat	Sikamat	Rantau	defeated in Ampangan
Last election	14 seats, 35.18% (Pakatan Rakyat)	22 seats, 51.83%	No seat, 12.26% (Pakatan Rakyat)
Seats before	14	21	Steady
Seats won	20	16	0
Seat change	▲6	▼5	Steady
Popular vote	258,737	182,294	35,913
Percentage	53.9%	37.98%	7.48%
Swing	▲18.72%	▼13.85%	▼4.78%
- Results by constituency
Menteri Besar before election
Mohamad Hasan
Barisan Nasional
Elected Menteri Besar
Aminuddin Harun
Pakatan Harapan

The 14th Negeri Sembilan State election was held on 9 May 2018, to elect the State Assemblymen of the Negeri Sembilan State Legislative Assembly, the legislature of the Malaysian state of Negeri Sembilan. The previous state election was held on 5 May 2013. The state assemblymen is elected to 5 years term each.

The Negeri Sembilan State Legislative Assembly was dissolved on 7 April 2018 by the Head of State (Yang di-Pertuan Besar of Negeri Sembilan) on the advice of the Head of Government (Menteri Besar of Negeri Sembilan).

The election was held concurrently with the 2018 Malaysian general election.

In a historic result, Barisan Nasional (BN), the ruling coalition was ousted from power by Pakatan Harapan (PH). Since the first Negeri Sembilan state election in 1955, BN or its predecessor Alliance had never lost the state election. PH won 20 seats in the election, gaining a simple majority, while BN won 16. Aminuddin Harun from PH's component party PKR was sworn in as new Menteri Besar on 12 May 2018.

== Contenders ==
Barisan Nasional (BN) contested in all 36 seats in Negeri Sembilan State Legislative Assembly. United Malays National Organisation (UNMO) contested in 22 seats, Malaysian Chinese Association (MCA) contested in 10 seats, Malaysian Indian Congress (MIC) and Parti Gerakan Rakyat Malaysia (Gerakan) contested in 2 seats each.

Pakatan Harapan (PH) contested in 35 seats in Negeri Sembilan. People's Justice Party (PKR) contested in 11 seats, Democratic Action Party (DAP) contested in 11 seats, Malaysian United Indigenous Party (Bersatu) contested in 6 seats and National Trust Party (Amanah) contested in 7 seats.

Pan-Malaysian Islamic Party (PAS) contested in 27 seats in Negeri Sembilan and lost in all of them.

=== Political parties ===
Coalition			
Incumbent	Opposition		
Barisan Nasional (BN)	Pakatan Harapan (PH)	Gagasan Sejahtera (GS)	
United Malays National Organisation (UMNO); Malaysian Chinese Association (MCA); Malaysian Indian Congress (MIC); Parti Gerakan Rakyat Malaysia (Gerakan)	People's Justice Party (PKR); Democratic Action Party (DAP); National Trust Party (Amanah); Malaysian United Indigenous Party (Bersatu)	Malaysian Islamic Party (PAS)	People's Alternative Party

== The contested seats ==
No.	State constituency	Incumbent State Assemblyman	Political parties							
No.	State constituency	Incumbent State Assemblyman	Barisan Nasional		Pakatan Harapan		Gagasan Sejahtera		Other parties/Ind	
No.	State constituency	Incumbent State Assemblyman	Candidate Name	Party	Candidate Name	Party	Candidate Name	Party	Candidate Name	Party
N01	Chennah	Anthony Loke Siew Fook (PH)	Seet Tee Yin	MCA	Anthony Loke Siew Fook	DAP	Jamalus Mansor	PAS		
N02	Pertang	Jalaluddin Alias (BN)	Noor Azmi Yusuf	UMNO	Osman Mohd Dusa	Bersatu	Hamran Abu Hassan	PAS		
N03	Sungai Lui	Mohd Razi Mohd Ali (BN)	Mohd Razi Mohd Ali	UMNO	Zainal Fikri Abd Kadir	PKR	Abdul Karim Shahimi Abdul Razak	PAS		
N04	Klawang	Yunus Rahmat (BN)	Baharuddin Jali	UMNO	Bakri Sawir	Amanah	Mazly Yasin	PAS		
N05	Serting	Shamsulkahar Mohd Deli (BN)	Shamsulkahar Mohd Deli	UMNO	Abd Rahman Ramli	Amanah	Muhammad Alzukri Muhammad Yasin	PAS		
N06	Palong	Lilah Yasin (BN)	Mustafa Nagoor	UMNO	Nor Arzemi Nordin	Bersatu	Masdi Musa	PAS		
N07	Jeram Padang	Manickam Letchuman (BN)	Manickam Letchuman	MIC	S. Musliadi Sabtu	PKR	Mohd Fairuz Mohd. Isa	PAS	Surash Sreenivasan	IND
N08	Bahau	Chew Seh Yong (PH)	Choong Wan You	MCA	Teo Kok Seong	DAP	Mustafar Bakri Abdul Aziz	PAS		
N09	Lenggeng	Vacant	Mazlan Maarop	UMNO	Suhaimi Kassim	Amanah	Muhammad Ghazali Abu Bakar	PAS		
N10	Nilai	Arul Kumar Jambunathan (PH)	Leaw Kok Chan	MCA	Arul Kumar Jambunathan	DAP	Mohd. Abu Zahrim Abdul Rahman	PAS		
N11	Lobak	Siow Kim Leong (PH)	Lim Kok Kean	MCA	Chew Seh Yong	DAP			Balamurugan Sanmugam	PAP
N12	Temiang	Ng Chin Tsai (PH)	Siow Koi Voon	MCA	Ng Chin Tsai	DAP	Yaw Con Seng	PAS		
N13	Sikamat	Aminuddin Harun (PH)	Samsul Amri Ismail	UMNO	Aminuddin Harun	PKR	Rahim Yusof	PAS	Bujang Abu	IND
N14	Ampangan	Abu Ubaidah Redza (BN)	Abu Ubaidah Redza	UMNO	Mohamad Rafie Ab. Malik	PKR	Mustaffa Daharun	PAS		
N15	Juasseh	Mohammad Razi Kail (BN)	Ismail Lasim	UMNO	Rosli Omar	PKR	Hassan Mohamed	PAS		
N16	Seri Menanti	Abd Samad Ibrahim (BN)	Abd Samad Ibrahim	UMNO	Jamali Salam	Bersatu	Rafiei Mustapha	PAS		
N17	Senaling	Ismail Lasim (BN)	Adnan Abu Hasan	UMNO	Md Rais Mohamad @ Basiron	Amanah	Fazilah Abu Samah	PAS		
N18	Pilah	Norhayati Omar (BN)	Norhayati Omar1	UMNO	Mohamad Nazaruddin Sabtu	PKR	Ahmad Fadzil Othman	PAS		
N19	Johol	Abu Samah Mahat (BN)	Saiful Yazan	UMNO	Zulkefly Mohamad	Amanah	Kamaruddin Md. Tahir	PAS		
N20	Labu	Hasim Rusdi (BN)	Hasim Rusdi	UMNO	Ismail Ahmad	PKR	Mohd. Khairil Anuar Mohd. Wafa	PAS	David Dass Aseerpatham	PAP
N21	Bukit Kepayang	Cha Kee Chin (PH)	Mah Kah Yong	Gerakan	Tan Lee Koon	DAP				
N22	Rahang	Mary Josephine Pritam Singh (PH)	Yap Sui Moi	MCA	Mary Josephine Pritam Singh	DAP			Saraswathy Paragazum	PAP
N23	Mambau	Yap Yew Weng (PH)	Hoi Choi Sin	MCA	Yap Yew Weng	DAP			T. Parimala Devi	PAP
N24	Seremban Jaya (previously known as Senawang)	Gunasekaren Palasamy (PH)	Choong Vee Hing	Gerakan	Gunasekaren Palasamy	DAP			Sagaya Rajan Xavier	PAP
N25	Paroi	Mohd Ghazali Wahid (BN)	Mohd Ghazali Wahid	UMNO	Mohamad Taufek Abd Ghani	Amanah	Masita Mohamed Ali	PAS		
N26	Chembong	Zaifulbahri Idris (BN)	Zaifulbahri Idris	UMNO	Azizan Marzuki	Bersatu	Rosmin Adam	PAS		
N27	Rantau	Mohamad Hasan (BN)	Mohamad Hasan	UMNO						
N28	Kota	Awaludin Said (BN)	Awaludin Said	UMNO	Shahrizal Masrudin	Amanah	Ishak Omar	PAS		
N29	Chuah	Chai Tong Chai (PH)	Lim Chin Sui	MCA	Yek Diew Ching	PKR				
N30	Lukut	Ean Yong Tin Sin (PH)	Yeong Con Yu	MCA	Choo Ken Hwa	DAP				
N31	Bagan Pinang	Tun Hairuddin Abu Bakar (BN)	Tun Hairuddin Abu Bakar	UMNO	Rashid Latiff	Bersatu				
N32	Linggi	Abd Rahman Mohd Redza (BN)	Abd Rahman Mohd Redza	UMNO	Rusli Abdullah	PKR	Noor Mohamad Rizal Ishak	PAS		
N33	Sri Tanjung (previously known as Port Dickson)	Ravi Munusamy (PH)	Thinalan Rojagapalu	MIC	Ravi Munusamy	PKR	Kamarol Ridzuan Mohd. Zain	PAS		
N34	Gemas	Abdul Razak Said (BN)	Abdul Razak Said	UMNO	Baharuddin Arif Siri	PKR	Abdul Halim Abu Bakar	PAS		
N35	Gemencheh	Mohd Isam Mohd Isa (BN)	Mohd Isam Mohd Isa	UMNO	Saiful Adly Abdul Wahab	Bersatu	Ishak Maasin	PAS		
N36	Repah	Veerapan Superamaniam (PH)	Pui Kim Swee	MCA	Veerapan Superamaniam	DAP	Abdul Razakek Abdul Rahim	PAS		

== Results ==
Party or alliance		Votes	%	Seats	+/–
Pakatan Harapan	Democratic Action Party	127,259	26.51	11	0
Pakatan Harapan	People's Justice Party	67,908	14.15	6	+3
Pakatan Harapan	National Trust Party	42,617	8.88	3	New
Pakatan Harapan	Malaysian United Indigenous Party	20,953	4.37	0	New
Pakatan Harapan	Total	258,737	53.90	20	+6
Barisan Nasional	United Malays National Organisation	134,014	27.92	15	-6
Barisan Nasional	Malaysian Chinese Association	34,245	7.13	0	0
Barisan Nasional	Malaysian Indian Congress	7,038	1.47	1	0
Barisan Nasional	Parti Gerakan Rakyat Malaysia	6,997	1.46	0	0
Barisan Nasional	Total	182,294	37.98	16	-6
Gagasan Sejahtera	Malaysian Islamic Party	35,913	7.48	0	0
People's Alternative Party		404	0.08	0	New
Independents		2,655	0.55	0	0
Total		480,003	100.00	36	0
Valid votes		480,003	98.12		
Invalid/blank votes		9,215	1.88		
Total votes		489,218	100.00		
Registered voters/turnout		607,793	80.49		
Source: SPR, The Star, ElectionData.MY

=== Seats that changed allegiance ===
No.	Seat	Previous Party (2013)	Current Party (2018)
N04	(Negeri Sembilan) Klawang	Barisan Nasional (UMNO)	Pakatan Harapan (AMANAH)
N09	(Negeri Sembilan) Lenggeng	Barisan Nasional (UMNO)	Pakatan Harapan (AMANAH)
N14	(Negeri Sembilan) Ampangan	Barisan Nasional (UMNO)	Pakatan Harapan (PKR)
N18	(Negeri Sembilan) Pilah	Barisan Nasional (UMNO)	Pakatan Harapan (PKR)
N20	(Negeri Sembilan) Labu	Barisan Nasional (UMNO)	Pakatan Harapan (PKR)
N25	(Negeri Sembilan) Paroi	Barisan Nasional (UMNO)	Pakatan Harapan (AMANAH)

== Election pendulum ==
The 14th General Election witnessed 20 governmental seats and 16 non-governmental seats filled the Negeri Sembilan State Legislative Assembly. The government side has 11 safe seats and 1 fairly safe seat, while the non-government side has 3 safe seats and 3 fairly safe seats. In addition, there was 1 seat that was won uncontested in non-governmental seats; namely Rantau (won by incumbent assemblyman, Mohamad Hasan).

2018 Negeri Sembilan state election

GOVERNMENT SEATS
Marginal
Labu	Ismail Ahmad	PKR	45.72
Lenggeng	Suhaimi Kassim	AMANAH	47.99
Chennah	Anthony Loke Siew Fook	DAP	50.91
Kelawang	Bakri Sawir	AMANAH	51.39
Ampangan	Mohamad Rafie Ab. Malik	PKR	51.43
Pilah	Mohamad Nazaruddin Sabtu	PKR	51.80
Paroi	Mohamad Taufek Abd. Ghani	AMANAH	52.18
Sikamat	Aminuddin Harun	PKR	55.87
Fairly safe
Repah	Veerapan Superamaniam	DAP	58.57
Safe
Sri Tanjung	Ravi Munusamy	PKR	62.62
Bahau	Teo Kok Seong	DAP	64.74
Temiang	Ng Chin Tsai	DAP	64.81
Chuah	Michael Yek Diew Ching	PKR	65.81
Nilai	Arul Kumar Jambunathan	DAP	68.48
Rahang	Mary Josephine Pritam Singh	DAP	73.98
Lukut	Choo Ken Hwa	DAP	79.00
Seremban Jaya	Gunasekaren Palasamy	DAP	80.41
Bukit Kepayang	Nicole Tan Lee Koon	DAP	83.29
Mambau	Yap Yew Weng	DAP	85.04
Lobak	Chew Seh Yong	DAP	87.46

NON-GOVERNMENT SEATS
Marginal
Jeram Padang	Manickam Letchuman	MIC	39.26
Gemencheh	Mohd. Isam Mohd. Isa	UMNO	47.38
Linggi	Abdul Rahman Mohd. Redza	UMNO	48.53
Pertang	Noor Azmi Yusuf	UMNO	49.00
Johol	Saiful Yazan Sulaiman	UMNO	49.34
Juasseh	Ismail Lasim	UMNO	50.41
Seri Menanti	Abdul Samad Ibrahim	UMNO	50.45
Senaling	Adnan Abu Hassan	UMNO	52.86
Serting	Shamsulkahar Mohd. Deli	UMNO	55.48
Fairly safe
Gemas	Abdul Razak Said	UMNO	56.16
Kota	Awaludin Said	UMNO	57.39
Bagan Pinang	Tun Hairuddin Abu Bakar	UMNO	57.83
Safe
Chembong	Zaifulbahri Idris	UMNO	60.45
Sungai Lui	Mohd. Razi Mohd. Ali	UMNO	62.56
Palong	Mustafa Nagoor	UMNO	66.15
*Win uncontested
Rantau	Mohamad Hasan	UMNO	n/a

== Aftermath ==
=== Rantau seat nomination dispute ===
Rantau constituency incumbent assemblyman and Barisan Nasional candidate Mohamad Hasan won his seat uncontested after People's Justice Party (PKR)’s candidate Dr Streram Sinnansamy was not allowed to enter the Nomination Centre to file his papers by the Election Commission (EC), supposedly because he did not have in his possession a pass issued by the Election Commission. However, the Election Court has on the 16 November 2018, allowed the petition by Dr S. Streram and passed a ruling that Mohamad Hasan had not been duly elected, subsequently nullified Hasan's result. A by-election was then held on 13 April 2019 after Mohamad Hasan's appeal was dismissed by the Federal Court on 18 February 2019. Mohamad Hasan emerged victorious and retained his seat again.
