= NAAR (restaurant) =

Indian restaurant in Himachal Pradesh

NAAR is an Indian restaurant located in a resort in Solan, Himachal Pradesh. It was started by Masque co-founder Prateek Sadhu. It has just 16 seats and is known for its multi-course meal.

In 2026, it was listed at #30 on William Reed's The World's 50 Best Restaurants, along with Masque.

== See also ==
- List of Indian restaurants
- The Manor (hotel)
