= Amanvari =

Mexican luxury resort

Amanvari

Amanvari is a luxury resort managed by Aman Resorts and located within the Costa Palmas development in Los Cabos, Baja California Sur, Mexico. It is Aman's first hotel in Mexico.

== Name ==
The name Amanvari combines the Sanskrit words for "peace" and "water".

== Development ==
In 2018, Aman Hotels announced that a resort in Mexico was in the pipeline. In 2025, the resort was named "Amanvari" and was scheduled to open in Spring 2026. The hotel eventually opened on August 1, 2026. The hotel is Aman's first property in Mexico and contains 18 rooms along with residences. The Financial Times reported on the buzz surrounding the hotel when it opened, and its alleged price per room per night of $6000; actually, the Times noted, rooms started at $4700 per night. Design for the hotel was initially done by Malaysian architect John Heah, and finished by Elastic Architects.
