= NAAR =

NAAR may refer to

- National Alliance for Autism Research
- National Assembly Against Racism
- NAAR (restaurant), Himachal Pradesh, India
