= The Sukhothai Bangkok =

Hotel in Bangkok

- โรงแรม สุโขทัย กรุงเทพ
- Interactive map of the The Sukhothai Bangkok area

General information
- Location: 13/3 South Sathorn Road, Bangkok10120, Thailand
- Coordinates: 13.723002°N 100.540908°E
- Completed: 1991
- Owner: HKR International Ltd.

Design and construction
- Architects: Kerry Hill, Ed Tuttle

Other information
- Number of rooms: 210
- Number of restaurants: 7

Website
- www.sukhothai.com/bangkok

The Sukhothai Bangkok (Thai: โรงแรม สุโขทัย กรุงเทพ) is a hotel in Bangkok, located in the city's Sathorn neighbourhood. The hotel opened in 1991, and is managed by Sukhothai Hotels and Resorts.

== History ==
The historic town of Sukhothai which means “The Dawn of Happiness” - and its surrounding region are known as a UNESCO World Heritage site. The Sukhothai hotel was opened in 1991 as the Beaufort Sukhothai hotel, then managed by the Beaufort group of hotels and was part of The Leading Hotels of the World marketing alliance. The hotel lies on six acres of land in Bangkok's Sathorn neighbourhood. It was developed by the Hong Kong-based real estate developer, HKR International with the help of Indonesian-hotelier, Adrian Zecha. The hotel was designed in a style inspired by the ancient Sukhothai Kingdom by the late Australian-architect, Kerry Hill alongside his American counterpart, Ed Tuttle. The hotel was one of Hill's first major projects, and also marked the only instance in which he collaborated with Tuttle.

In 2020, the hotel joined Small Luxury Hotels of the World as a partner hotel.

== Awards ==
- Tourism Authority of Thailand: 2015 The Best of Thailand Awards Voted by Chinese Tourists – Top 10 Best Luxury Hotel
- Forbes Travel Guide: 4 Star Rated Hotels 2016-2018
- Conde Nast Travel Magazine Readers' Choice Awards: 2009 - Top 100 Asia Hotels, 2010 – Top 125 Hotels in Asia, 2011 Gold list, 2011 Top 20 Overseas Business Hotels, 2013 - Top 15 Hotels in Thailand, 2015 & 2017 - Top 10 Hotels in Bangkok
- SmartTravelAsia.com: Best in Travel 2013 - No.10 in Best Leisure Hotel / Resort in Asia, Best in Travel 2014 - No.15 in Best Leisure Hotel / Resort in Asia, 2009 Top 25 List – Business Hotels; Top 25 List – Leisure Hotels
- The Daily Telegraph: 2011 – The 50 Best Hotels in the World

== Gallery ==
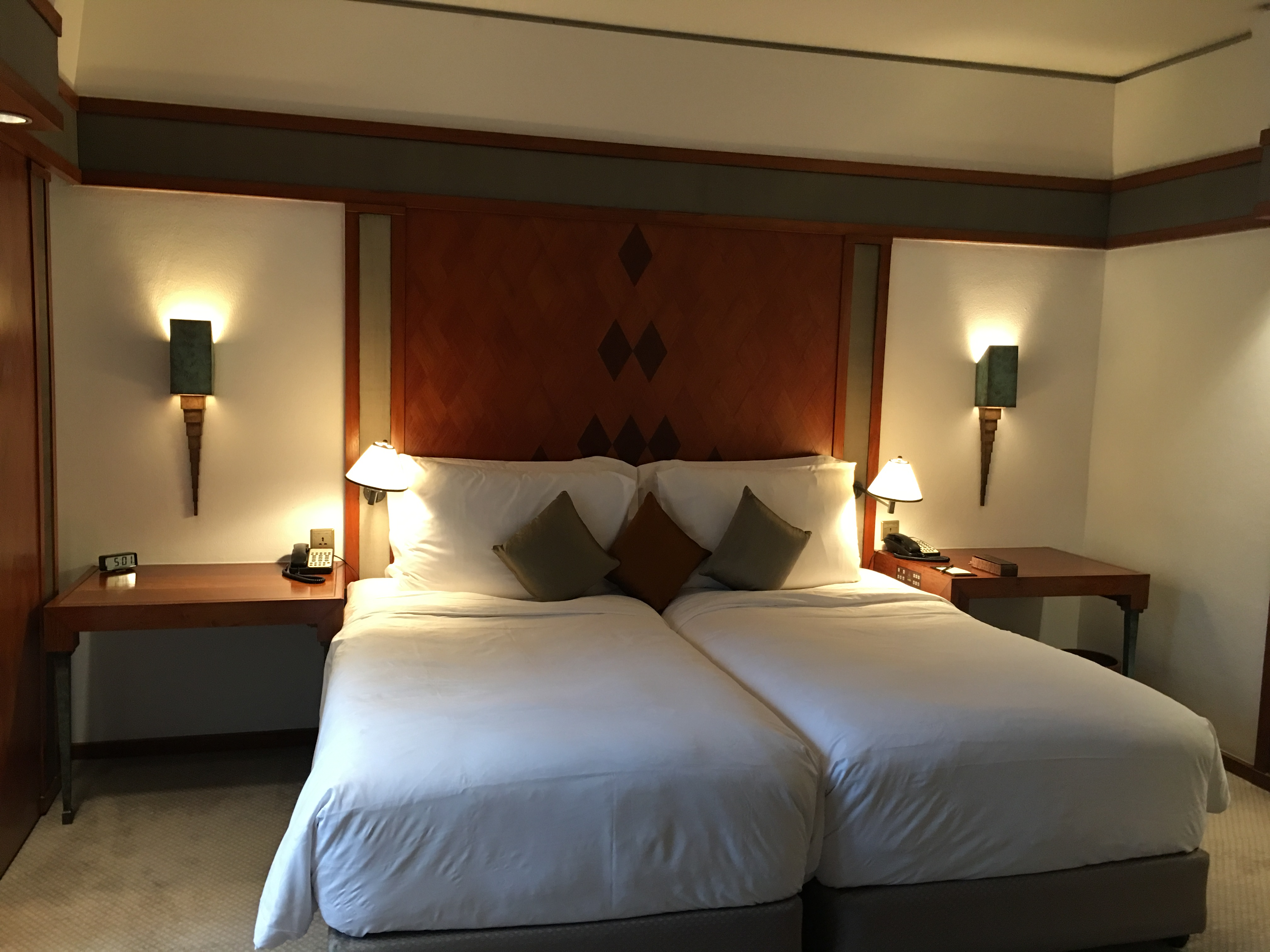
Suite bedroom

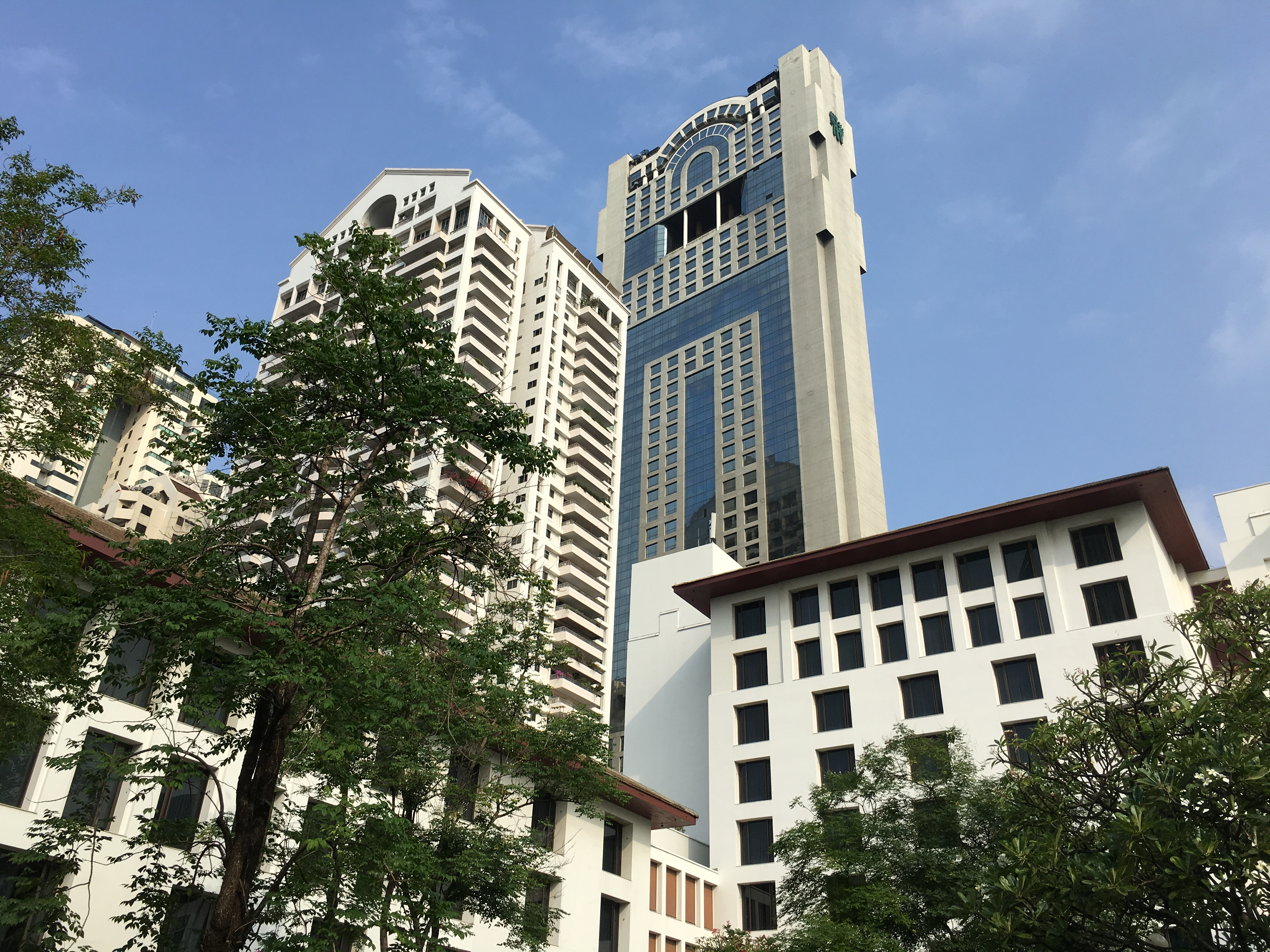
Courtyard
