= Amanpuri =

Luxury resort in Phuket, Thailand

Coordinates: 7.98459°N 98.27615°E

General information
- Location: Phuket
- Opening: 1988; 38 years ago
- Owner: Aman Resorts
- Operator: Aman Resorts

Technical details
- Floor count: 1

Design and construction
- Architect: Ed Tuttle
- Developer: Adrian Zecha

Other information
- Number of rooms: 84
- Number of restaurants: 4

Website
- www.aman.com/resorts/amanpuri

Amanpuri is a luxury resort and the flagship property of Aman Resorts. Its name means 'place of peace' in Sanskrit. It is on the west coast of the Thai island of Phuket. The resort is situated on a coconut grove overlooking the Andaman Sea, and includes a stretch of Pansea Beach.

== History ==
The location, a former coconut plantation, was chosen by Adrian Zecha while looking for a site where to build a luxurious holiday home in Phuket. Plans to build a home on the site developed into an idea to build a small resort, in partnership with Anil Thadani and two other entrepreneurs. They mainly spent their own money, as no banks would extend credit for the project due to the small number of planned rooms, instead of the 500-room hotel they thought would be more practical. The resort was opened in 1988 at a cost of US$4 million. It was designed by American architect Ed Tuttle, who took his inspiration from traditional Thai temple architecture, in particular the ancient Thai capital of Ayutthaya.

== Facilities ==
The resort contains 40 pavilions and 44 villas spread over 24 hectares on a headland on the northern side of Pansea Beach. Each villa features a swimming pool, separate dining and living rooms, a kitchen and up to 9 bedrooms. The property also features four restaurants.
