= Aman Resorts =

Luxury hotel group

Aman
- Industry: Hospitality, hotels
- Founded: 1988
- Founder: Adrian Zecha
- Headquarters: Baar, Switzerland
- Number of locations: 35 (2024)
- Area served: Worldwide
- Key people: Vladislav Doronin (CEO, owner and chairman); Ben Trodd (COO)
- Products: Hotels, spas, clothing
- Parent: Aman Group Sarl
- Website: aman.com

Aman Resorts is the trading entity of Aman Group Sarl, a Swiss-headquartered multinational hospitality company. Founded by Indonesian hotelier Adrian Zecha in 1988, the company operates 36 properties in 20 countries. It is owned by Russian real estate developer and art collector Vladislav Doronin, who is also its chairman and CEO.

== History ==
=== Founding ===
Founded in 1988, Aman Resorts' first destination was the result of hotelier Adrian Zecha's desire to build a holiday home in Phuket. His plans soon developed into an idea to build a small boutique resort with Anil Thadani and two other friends. They invested their own money in the venture as no banks would lend for the project due to the small number of planned rooms. The resort opened as Amanpuri in 1988, with nightly rates reportedly five times higher than local competitors.

By 1992, following the success of the first hotel, the group had expanded to include several resorts in Indonesia, a resort on Bora Bora and one in the Alpine village of Courchevel. Later, Clement Vaturi acquired a majority stake in the company, thereby allowing the boutique hotels to be further conceptualized.

=== First ownership dispute (1998) ===
In 1998, Vaturi's controlling interest was acquired by Los Angeles-based Colony Capital, a real estate investment fund. A lawsuit between Vaturi and Colony Capital promised to drag on, and Colony Capital moved to protect its interests by taking a more active role in the company. At this time, Zecha resigned from his position at Aman and pursued other interests for the next two years.

In 2000, Colony Capital and Vaturi settled their lawsuit, and Vaturi sold his shareholding interests to Lee Hing Development, a Hong Kong investment company. With controlling investors allowing full control over the company, Zecha returned as chairman and CEO. Over the next seven years, Aman launched retreats in Cambodia, India, Bhutan, Sri Lanka, and the Caribbean. On 27 November 2007, DLF, India's largest real estate company, acquired Lee Hing's controlling stake in Aman Resorts for $400 million, including debt of $150 million.

=== Second ownership dispute (2014) ===
In early February 2014, DLF sold Aman Resorts for $358 million to Aman Resorts Group, an investment company led by Russian businessman Vladislav Doronin, which also included Omar Amanat. The sale included all Aman properties except for the Lodhi Hotel in Delhi. DLF sold Aman Resorts to reduce its debt and refocus on real estate after it had expanded into hotels, wind farms, and running export processing zones. In April, Zecha stepped down as chairman a second time, and the company relocated its headquarters from Singapore to London in June. Its corporate headquarters has since been moved to Baar, Switzerland. Doronin assumed the position of chairman, and French hotelier Olivier Jolivet was appointed chief executive officer in 2014.

=== Aman under Doronin (2015–present) ===
In August 2015, Doronin became the sole owner of Aman when Pontwelly Holding Company took full ownership of Aman's hospitality business, Silverlink Resorts. Following this restructuring, Doronin and board director Alan Djanogly remain the only two directors. In February 2017, Roland Fasel joined Aman as chief operating officer, continuing a 25-plus-year career in luxury hospitality. Olivier Jolivet left the company the same year and Doronin assumed the position of chief executive officer.

In 2020, Doronin unveiled Janu, a spin-off brand that operates larger hotels in Japan, Montenegro, and Saudi Arabia, reportedly aiming to become a slightly more affordable complement to Aman. The group's diversification strategy continued in 2021 with the launching of a clothing line, marking a shift towards becoming a self-proclaimed lifestyle brand.

In August 2022, Aman New York opened at the Crown Building. Four years later, Amanvari in Costa Palmas, Mexico had a heavily-hyped opening that was marked by controversy.

In August 2026, the ownership of Amanyara in Turks & Caicos was considering terminating the management agreement with Aman Hotels, stating that service standards under Aman Resorts' management had declined since Vlad Doronin had taken over the brand.

== Hotels ==
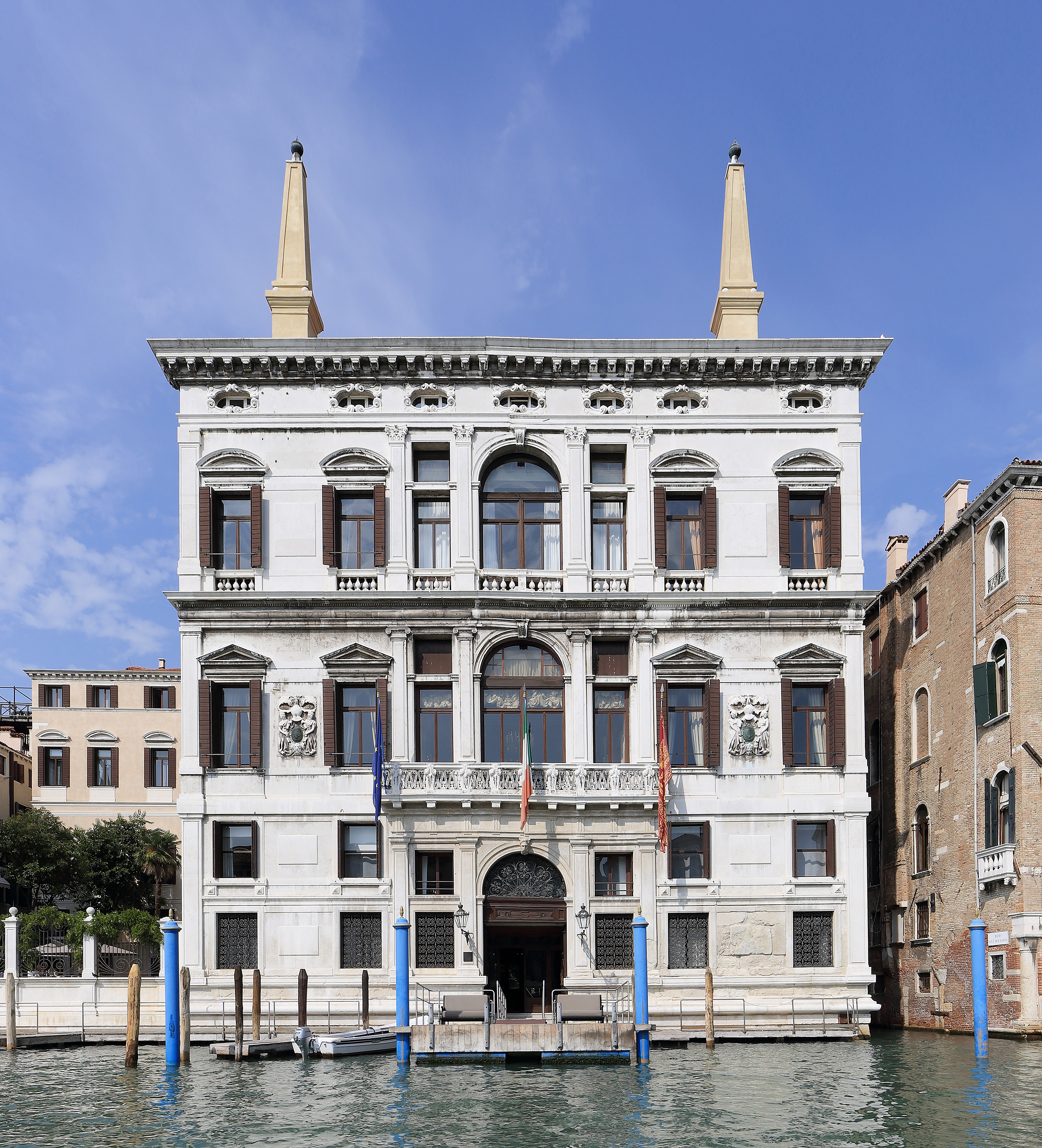
Aman Venice, Italy occupying the Palazzo Papadopoli

Each Aman property typically has a small number of rooms, usually fewer than 55. The brand is often characterised by media outlets to offer remarkable service, with many of its properties reportedly having a staff count typically of six staff to one guest.

Outside urban settings, guest accommodation is typically provided in individual private villas, pavilions, or tents (in the case of Aman-i-Khás in India, Amanwana in Indonesia, and Amanpulo in the Philippines), and often includes private outdoor lounging and dining areas.

Aman mandates a concern for cultural preservation, and several properties are said to have some historical background and importance. In Cambodia, for instance, the company acquired a ruined guest villa that had been built in the early 1960s by the country's King Sihanouk. All architectural records of the villa had been destroyed, but the discovery of an old tourist book with pictures of the building allowed the company to closely replicate what had been lost.

Since its establishment, Aman has been highly rated by Condé Nast Traveler, Zagat Survey, Gallivanter's Guide, Harper's Hideaway" and Travel & Leisure. 34% of Aman patrons reportedly originate from Europe, another 34% from Asia-Pacific, 28% from the Americas and 4% from the rest of the world.

== Architects ==
Among the architects who have designed Aman properties are Emine Ögün, Ed Tuttle, Jaya Ibrahim, Jean-Michel Gathy (Denniston), Kerry Hill, Marwan Al-Sayed, Mehmet Ögün, Peter Muller, Rick Joy, Turgut Cansever. and Francisco Mañosa.

== Financial malpractice ==
In January 2023 Charles McGonigal, a former high-ranking FBI official and global director of security for Aman Group, was arrested on charges of money laundering and for violating US sanctions law. According to the US Department of Justice, McGonigal conspired with a former Russian diplomat to assist Oleg Deripaska, a sanctioned Russian oligarch. McGonigal’s hiring in the spring of 2022 was done through a very obscure process, according to Aman staffers, and raised many eyebrows because the previous director of corporate security was reassigned for no apparent reasons and because when reports that McGonigal was under investigation had surfaced and the first witnesses were scheduled to appear before the grand jury investigation of his conduct, he continued to be retained by the company.

== Locations ==
As of 2025, the group operates a total of 36 properties in 20 countries:

Name	Location	Country/Territory	Year of opening	Designer
Aman Kyoto	Kyoto	Japan	2019	Kerry Hill
Aman Le Mélézin	Courchevel	France	1992	Ed Tuttle
Aman Nai Lert Bangkok	Bangkok	Thailand	2025	Jean-Michel Gathy of Denniston, Openbox Architects
Aman New York	New York City	United States	2022	Jean-Michel Gathy of Denniston
Aman Sveti Stefan	Sveti Stefan	Montenegro	2008	Jean-Michel Gathy of Denniston
Aman Tokyo	Tokyo	Japan	2014	Kerry Hill
Aman Venice	Venice	Italy	2013	Jean-Michel Gathy of Denniston and Elastic Architects
Aman Villas at Nusa Dua	Nusa Dua	Indonesia	1992	Kerry Hill, Danilo Capellini, and Dale Keller
Aman-i-Khas	Sawai Madhopur	India	2003	Jean-Michel Gathy of Denniston
Amanbagh	Alwar	India	2005	Ed Tuttle
Amandari	Ubud	Indonesia	1989	Peter Muller
Amandayan	Lijiang	China	2015	Jaya Ibrahim
Amanemu	Shima	Japan	2016	Kerry Hill
Amanera	Río San Juan	Dominican Republic	2015	John Heah
Amanfayun	Hangzhou	China	2010	Jaya Ibrahim
Amangalla	Galle	Sri Lanka	2005	Kerry Hill
Amangani	Jackson Hole	United States	1998	Ed Tuttle
Amangiri	Lake Powell	United States	2009	Marwan Al-Sayed, Rick Joy, and Wendell Burnett
Amanjena	Marrakesh	Morocco	2000	Ed Tuttle
Amanjiwo	Magelang	Indonesia	1997	Ed Tuttle
Amankila	Karangasem	Indonesia	1992	Ed Tuttle and Danilo Capellini
Amankora	Thimphu	Bhutan	2004	Kerry Hill
Amanoi	Ninh Hải	Vietnam	2013	Jean-Michel Gathy of Denniston
Amanpulo	Pamalican	Philippines	1993	Bobby Manosa
Amanpuri	Phuket	Thailand	1988	Ed Tuttle
Amanrüya	Bodrum	Turkey	2011	Turgut Cansever, Emine Ögün, and Mehmet Ögün
Amansara	Siem Reap	Cambodia	2002	Kerry Hill
Amantaka	Luang Prabang	Laos	2009	Jean-Michel Gathy of Denniston
Amanvari	Los Cabos	Mexico	2026	Ria Vogiatzi-Xenou and Alexandros Xenos of Elastic Architects
Amanwana	Moyo	Indonesia	1993	Jean-Michel Gathy of Denniston
Amanwella	Tangalle	Sri Lanka	2005	Kerry Hill
Amanyangyun	Shanghai	China	2017	Kerry Hill
Amanyara	Turks and Caicos Islands	(United Kingdom) Turks and Caicos Islands	2006	Jean-Michel Gathy of Denniston
Amanzoe	Kranidi	Greece	2012	Ed Tuttle
Janu Tokyo	Tokyo	Japan	2024	Jean-Michel Gathy of Denniston
Rosa Alpina (Note: Property under partnership agreement with Aman Resorts, as it undergoes a four-year transformation into a full-fledged Aman.)	Alta Badia	Italy	2020	Jean-Michel Gathy of Denniston

=== Upcoming properties ===
Name	Location	Country/Territory	Planned year of opening
Aman Beverly Hills	Beverly Hills	United States	2027
Aman Dubai	Dubai	United Arab Emirates	2027
Aman Karingani	Karingani Game Reserve	Mozambique	TBA
Aman Maldives	Maldives	Maldives	TBA
Aman Miami Beach	Miami Beach	United States	2026
Aman Niseko	Niseko	Japan	2027
Aman Seoul	Seoul	South Korea	TBA
Aman Singapore	Singapore	Singapore	TBA
Amancaya	Exuma	Bahamas	TBA
Amansamar	Wadi Safar	Saudi Arabia	TBD
Janu Dubai	Dubai	United Arab Emirates	2027

== Related ventures ==
While Aman presently has no footprint in London, it opened a standalone Aman Spa in the basement floors of The Connaught in 2009. Designed by Jaya Ibrahim, the spa has five rooms and offers mainly Asian-based treatments, ranging from Thai hot herbal compresses to Himalayan crystal salt body scrubs.

Aman operates a luxury yacht called Amandira, which launched in 2015 and sails through the waters of Eastern Indonesia. The yacht, modeled after the traditional Indonesian sailing vessel pinisi, has five cabins that can accommodate up to 10 guests.

In 2023, Aman opened Aman Residences Tokyo, the company's first standalone residential property, in the Azabudai Hills skyscraper complex. Designed by Pelli Clarke Pelli Architects and Yabu Pushelberg, it encompasses 11 floors with 91 units in total, and ranks as the tallest residential towers in Tokyo.

In December 2023, Aman launched Aman Interiors, presenting limited edition furniture collections in collaboration with Japanese architect Kengo Kuma.

== Gallery ==
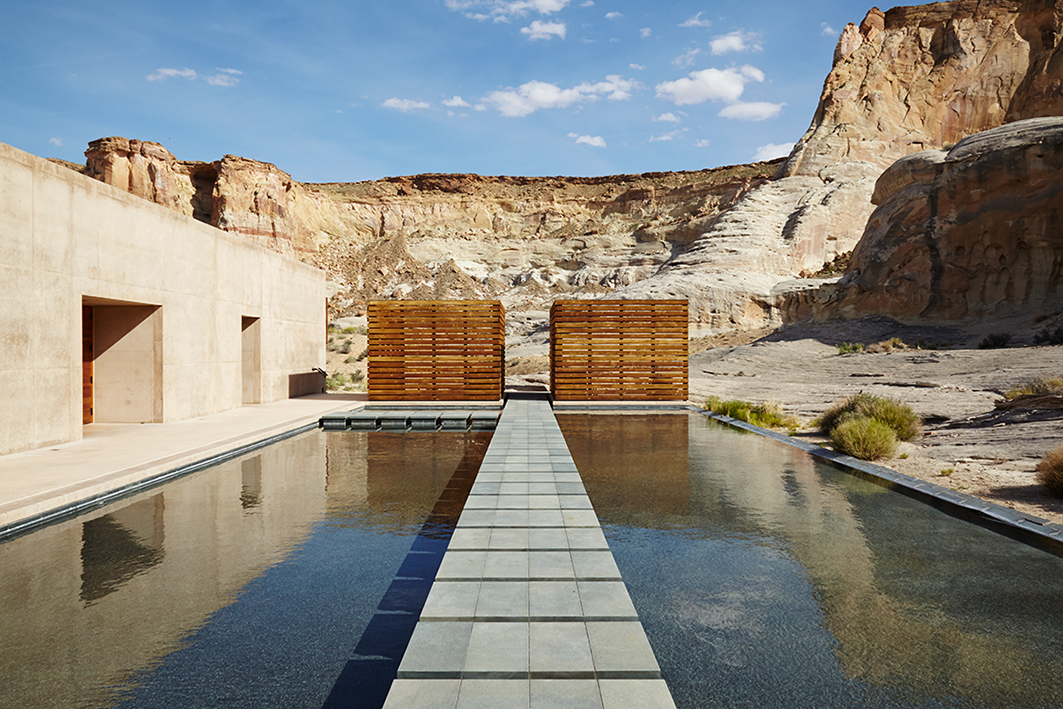
Amangiri, USA

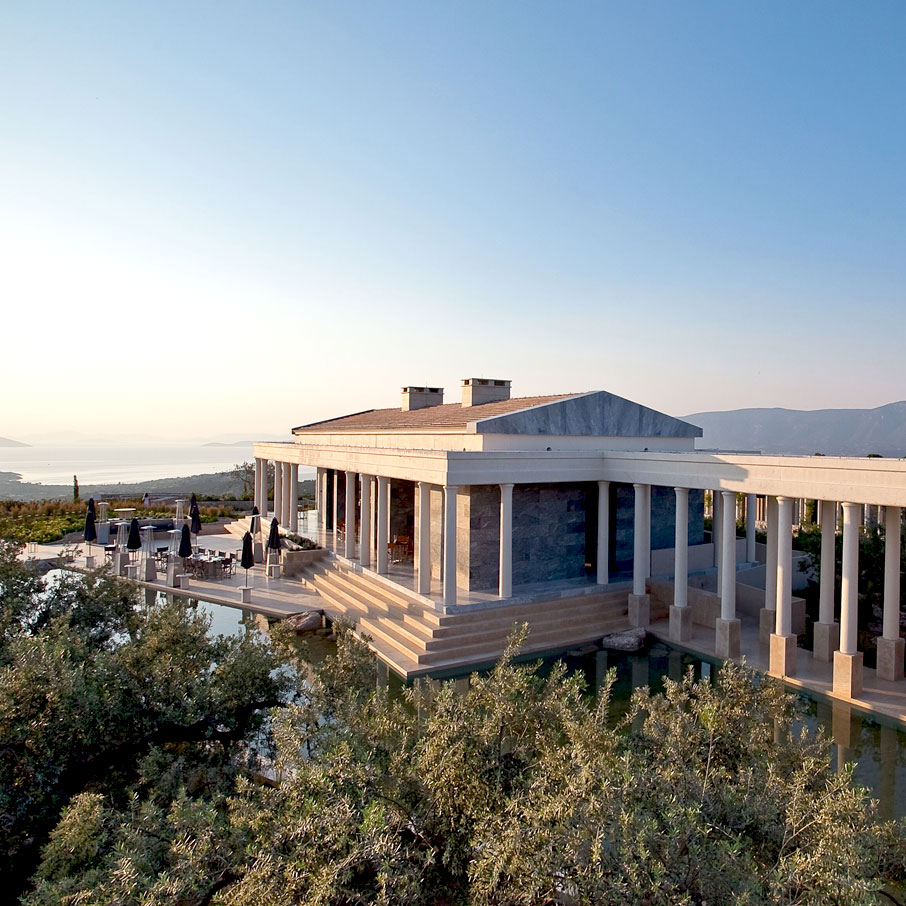
Amanzoe, Greece

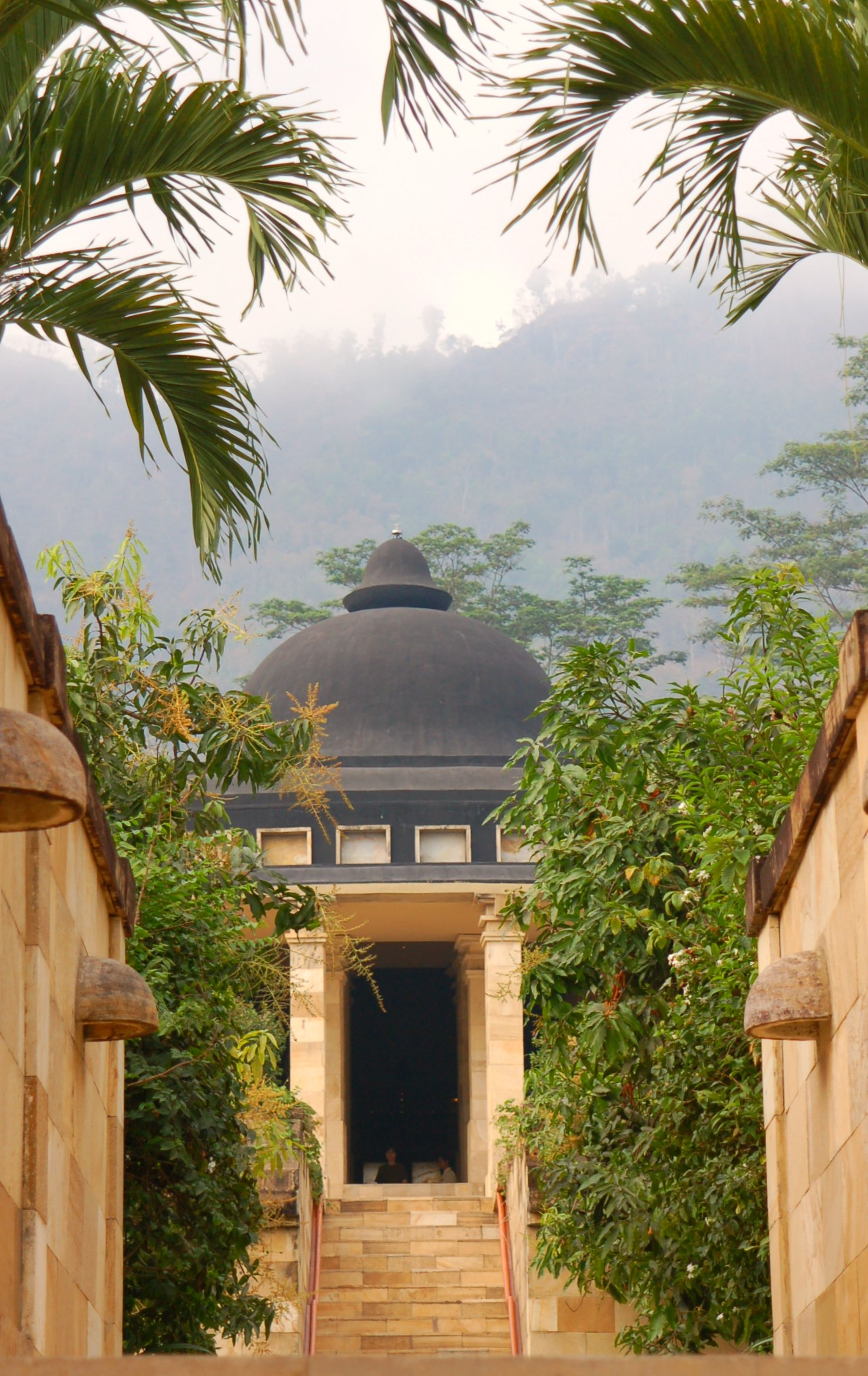
Amanjiwo, Indonesia

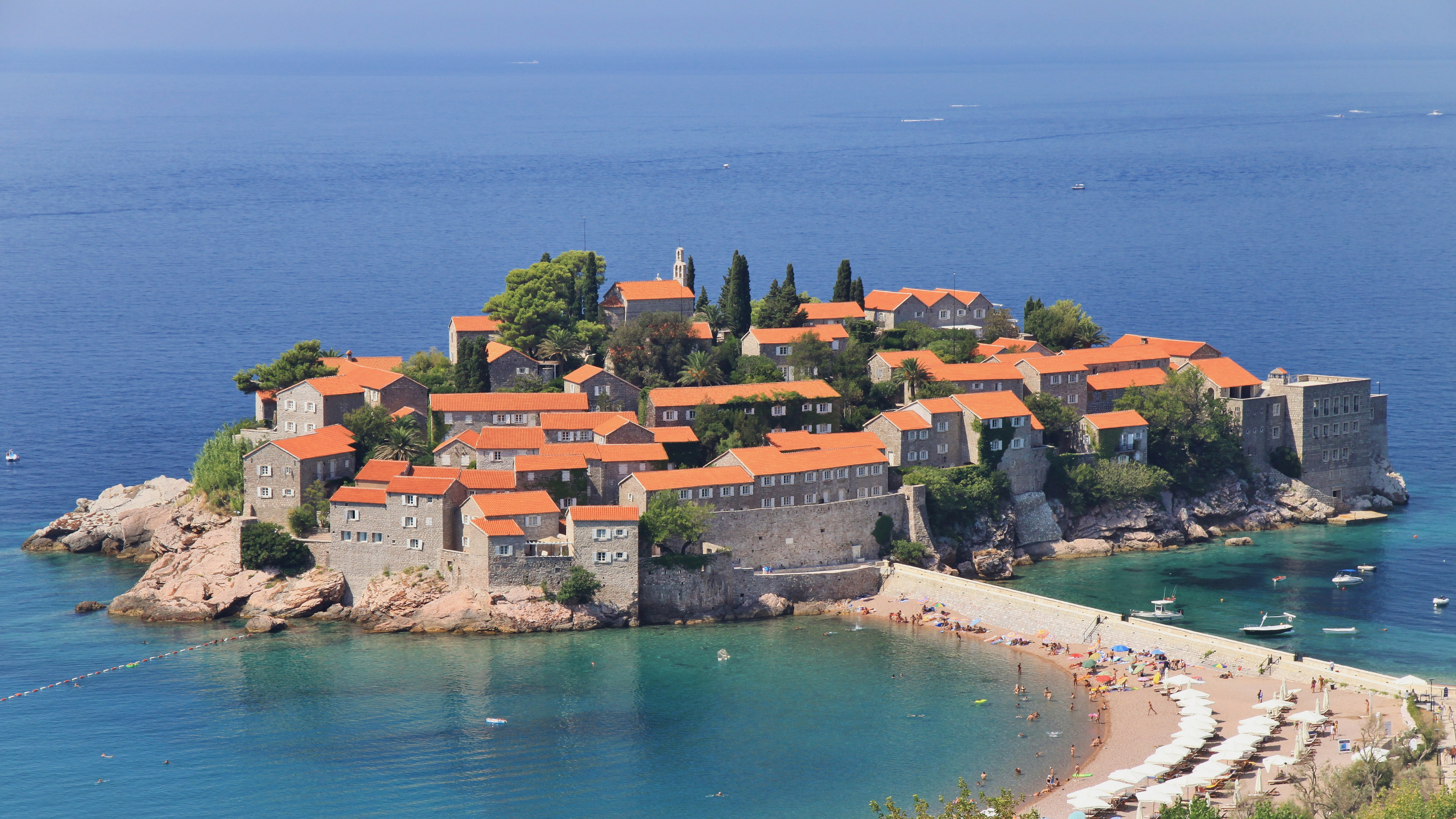
Aman Sveti Stefan, Montenegro

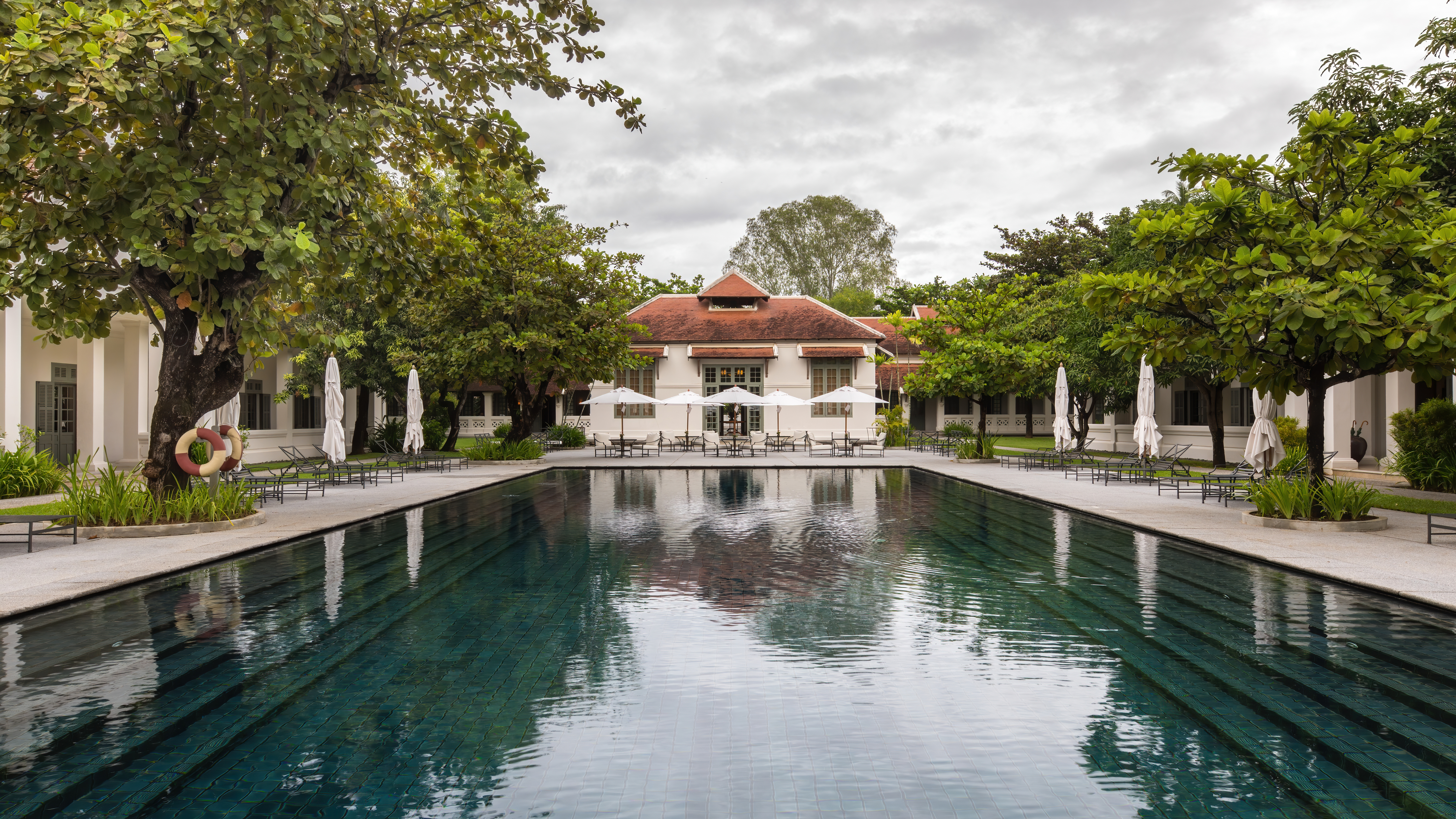
Amantaka, Laos
