= Masque (restaurant) =

Mumbai high-end restaurant

Coordinates: 18.98982°N 72.82562°E

Masque Restaurant
- Interactive map of Masque Restaurant

Restaurant information
- Established: 2016
- Head chef: Varun Totlani
- Food type: Indian
- Location: Unit G3, Laxmi Woollen Mills, Shakti Mills Lane, Off Dr. E. Moses Road, Mahalaxmi, Mumbai 400011, Mumbai, Maharashtra, India
- Reservations: Yes
- Website: www.masquerestaurant.com

Masque is an Indian restaurant located in Mumbai, Maharashtra. It was founded by Prateek Sadhu and Aditi Dugar in 2016.

Masque is best known for its 10-course tasting menu and is often counted among Asia's and India's best restaurants. In 2022, it was ranked #21 in the list of Asia's 50 Best Restaurants. In 2026, it was ranked #26 in William Reed's The World's 50 Best Restaurants, the first for an Indian restaurant since 2007 when Bukhara was featured.

== See also ==
- Indian Accent
- List of Indian restaurants
