= Amankila =

Hotel in Karangasem, Bali, Indonesia

- Location within Bali
- Hotel chain: Aman Resorts

General information
- Location: Near Manggis, Karangasem Regency, Bali, Indonesia
- Coordinates: 8°30′3″S 115°31′39″E
- Opening: March 1992
- Owner: PT. Nusantara Island Resort

Design and construction
- Architect: Ed Tuttle

Other information
- Number of suites: 34
- Number of restaurants: 2

Website
- https://www.aman.com/resorts/amankila

Amankila (meaning: "Peaceful hill") is a luxury coastal hotel situated on the hill of Indrakila, near Manggis in Karangasem Regency in eastern Bali, Indonesia. It is operated by Aman Resorts and was opened in March 1992. The resort is located close to Manggis, Candi Dasa, Tenganan and other villages where traditional crafts are still practiced. Lonely Planet describes Amankila as "one of Bali's best resorts".

== History ==
Amankila was opened in March 1992 by Aman Resorts founder, Adrian Zecha. The hotel became the third Aman hotel to open in Bali, after Amandari in Ubud and Amanusa in the Nusa Dua Peninsula. The hotel was built as the result of a cooperation between Zecha and Indonesian businessman Franky Tjahyadikarta, owner of the lands occupied by Amankila and the Zecha's nearby project, The Serai Manggis (later Alila Manggis).

== Architecture ==
The hotel, designed by the late architect Ed Tuttle, is set amongst the backdrop of Mount Agung, a volcano revered as a home of the gods that overlooks the Lombok Strait. In designing the hotel, Tuttle was inspired by the palaces of Ujung and Tirtagangga. In an interview with Architectural Digest, Tuttle explained the following. "Respect for both the cultural context of the location and the potential impact of the structures on the surrounding environment is fundamental.”

The hotel has 34 suites which are fashioned as beach houses and are linked by walkways. The suites are thatched roof and freestanding with individual terraces furnished with daybeds. The tables are made of coconut shells and chairs are rattan.

The hotel's main building complex is clad with blonde stone and adorned with Corinthian columns. A large outdoor staircase, a trademark of Tuttle's design leads to the hotel's three-tiered infinity pool; the pool, resembling terraced fields, is built into a cliff edge. Each pool flows into the one below it and its construction includes blue tiling.

Located at the base of the cliff is the hotel's private black-sand beach. The hotel's beach club, set within coconut palms and a frangipani tree, is located here with its own 41 m (135 ft) pool, water sport rentals and private lounging bales.

== Gallery ==
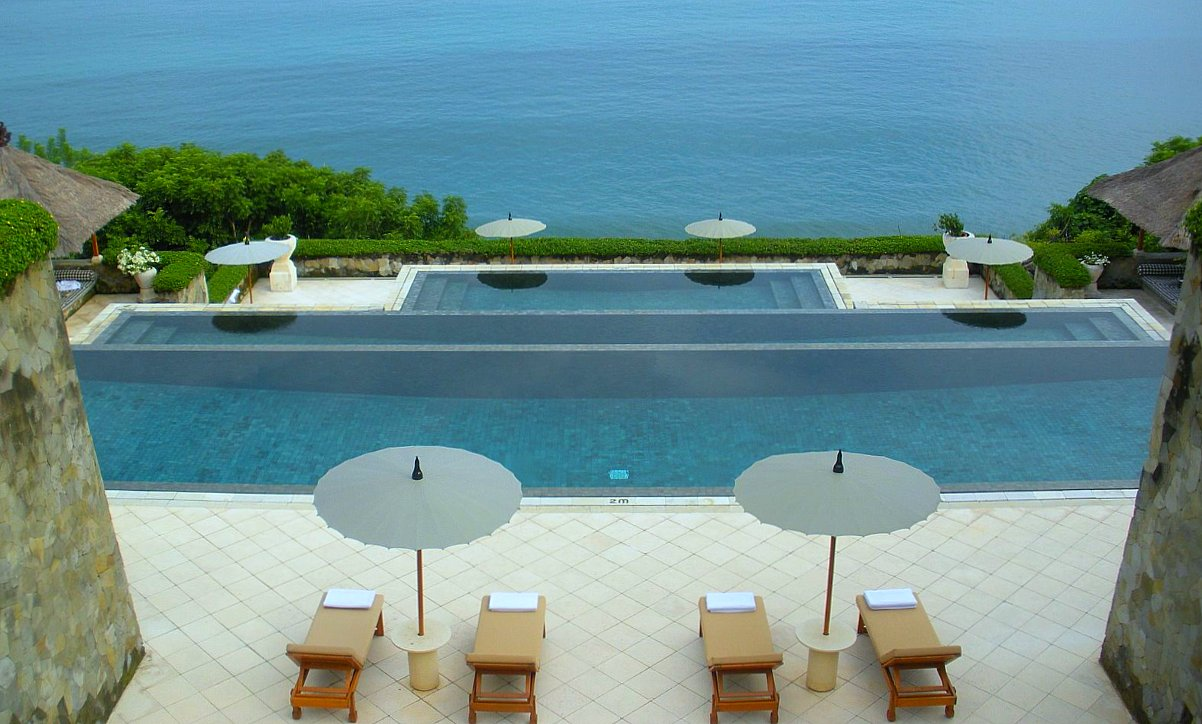
Amankila's three-tiered infinity pool.

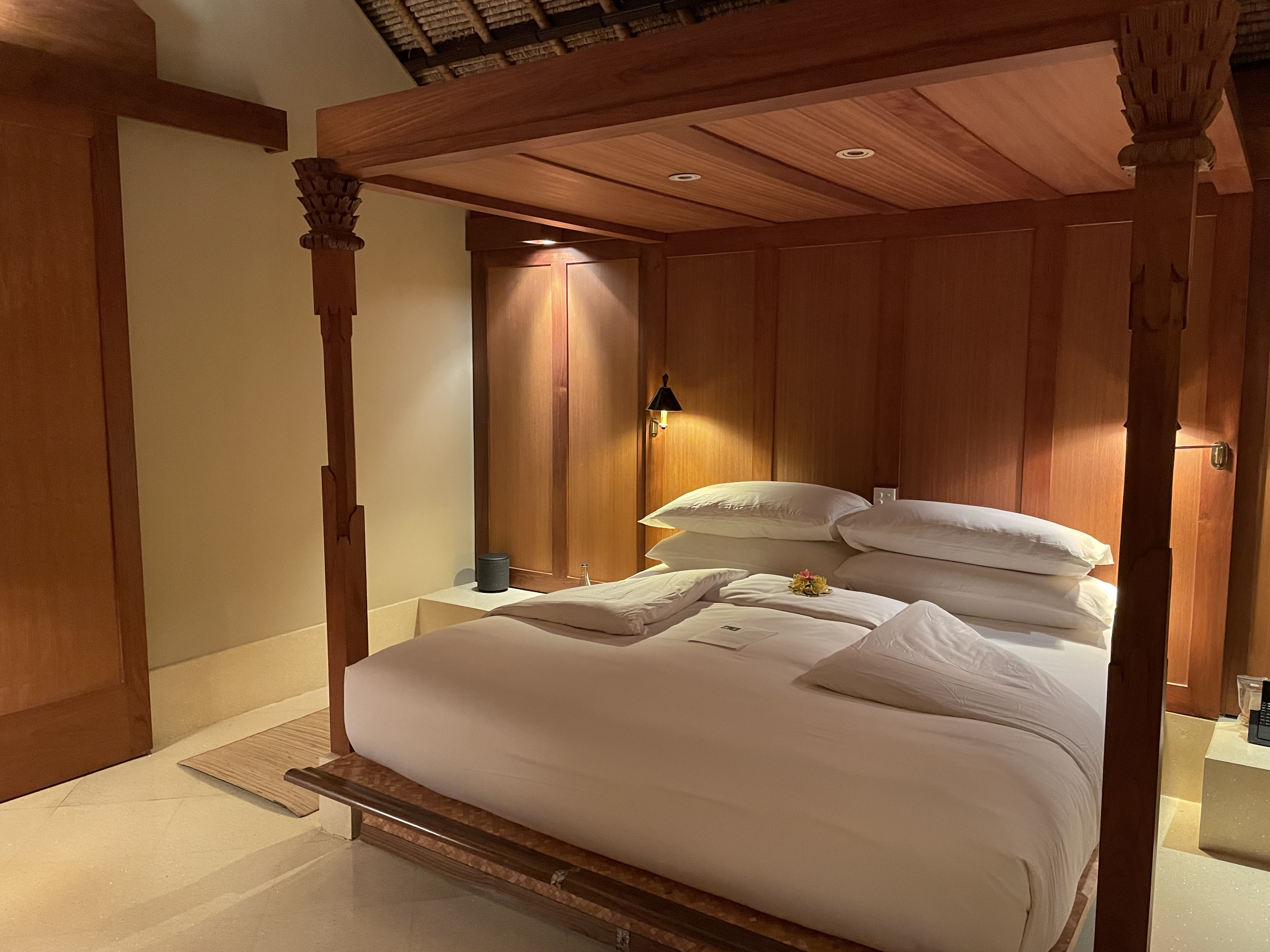
Suite bedroom at Amankila
