= The Manor (hotel) =

Hotel in New Delhi, India

Coordinates: 28.57094°N 77.25688°E

The Manor is an Indian luxury hotel located in New Delhi. Originally an inn that dates back to the 1950s, the hotel was made over in the 1990s by Vinay Kapoor and Shirley Fujikama and officially relaunched in 1999. It is known for its zen environment and only has 12 rooms.

In its prime, The Manor was known for the Indian Accent restaurant before it moved to The Lodhi in 2017. Subsequently, it was shut down for repairs before reopening in 2019.
