= Amangiri =

Resort hotel in Utah, U.S.

Coordinates: 37°0′52.5″N 111°36′40″W

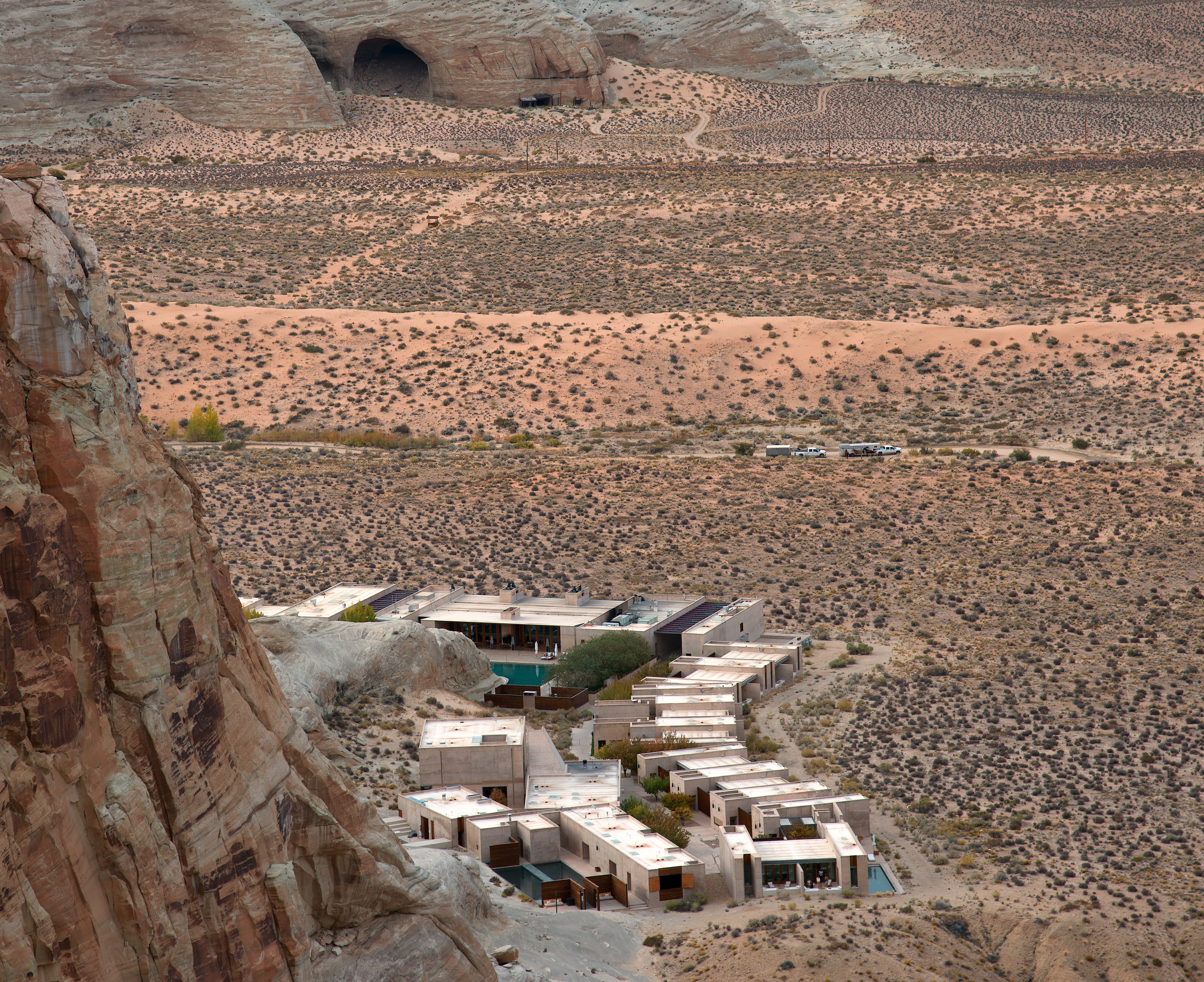
- The resort, 2017
- Interactive map of the Amangiri area

General information
- Location: 1 Kayenta Rd; Canyon Point, Utah, U.S.
- Opening: 2009; 17 years ago
- Owner: Aman Resorts

Design and construction
- Awards and prizes: Michelin key

Other information
- Number of rooms: 34

Website
- aman.com/resorts/amangiri

Amangiri is a luxury resort hotel in Canyon Point in the Glen Canyon National Recreation region of Utah. Part of Aman Resorts based in Baar, Switzerland next to Zug, it was built by Marwan Al-Sayed, Rick Joy, and Wendell Burnett, and opened in 2009.

== History ==
The resort opened in 2009 with 34 suites. It became known for being Instagram-friendly and as a favorite destination for many celebrities. In 2020, the resort expanded, adding Camp Sarika, which includes 10 free-standing tented pavilions which can accommodate 30 guests.

In 2022, it announced the construction of 36 private residences that are marketed between $7.5 million and $15 million. The first residence remains in the construction phase as of June 2024.

== Facilities ==
The hotel sits on a 600-acre (240 ha) parcel of land, which was acquired via a land swap with the U.S. Bureau of Land Management that was approved by the U.S. Congress.

The hotel was designed by Marwan Al-Sayed, Rick Joy, and Wendell Burnett. It has a minimalist aesthetic, making heavy use of large concrete slabs. Each room has an open view to the surrounding desert landscape. A sandstone rock escarpment protrudes into the main swimming pool.

The main dining room can accommodate 79 guests and serves Native American–inspired cuisine. There is also a 25,000-square-foot (2,300 m^{2}) spa.

Amangiri

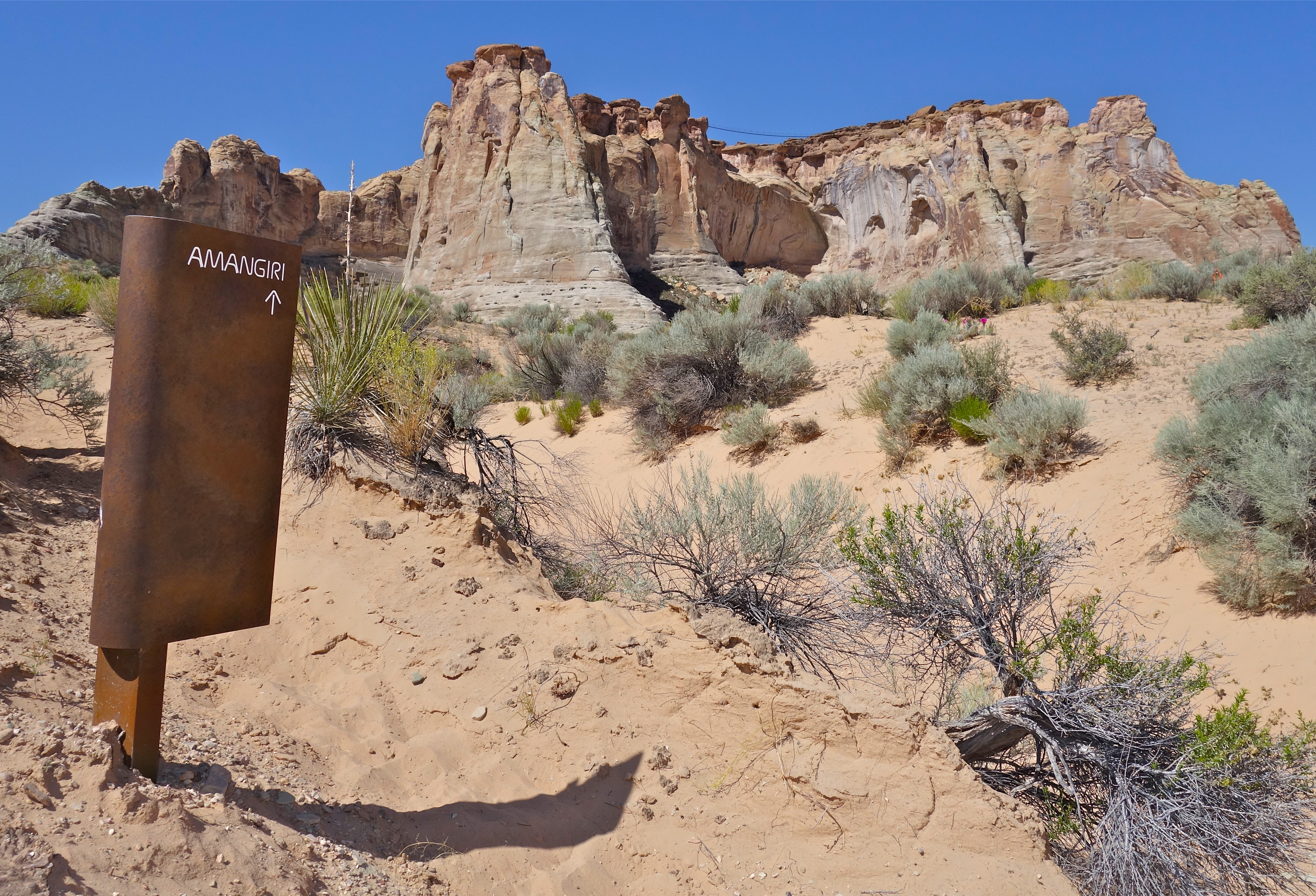
Entrance sign

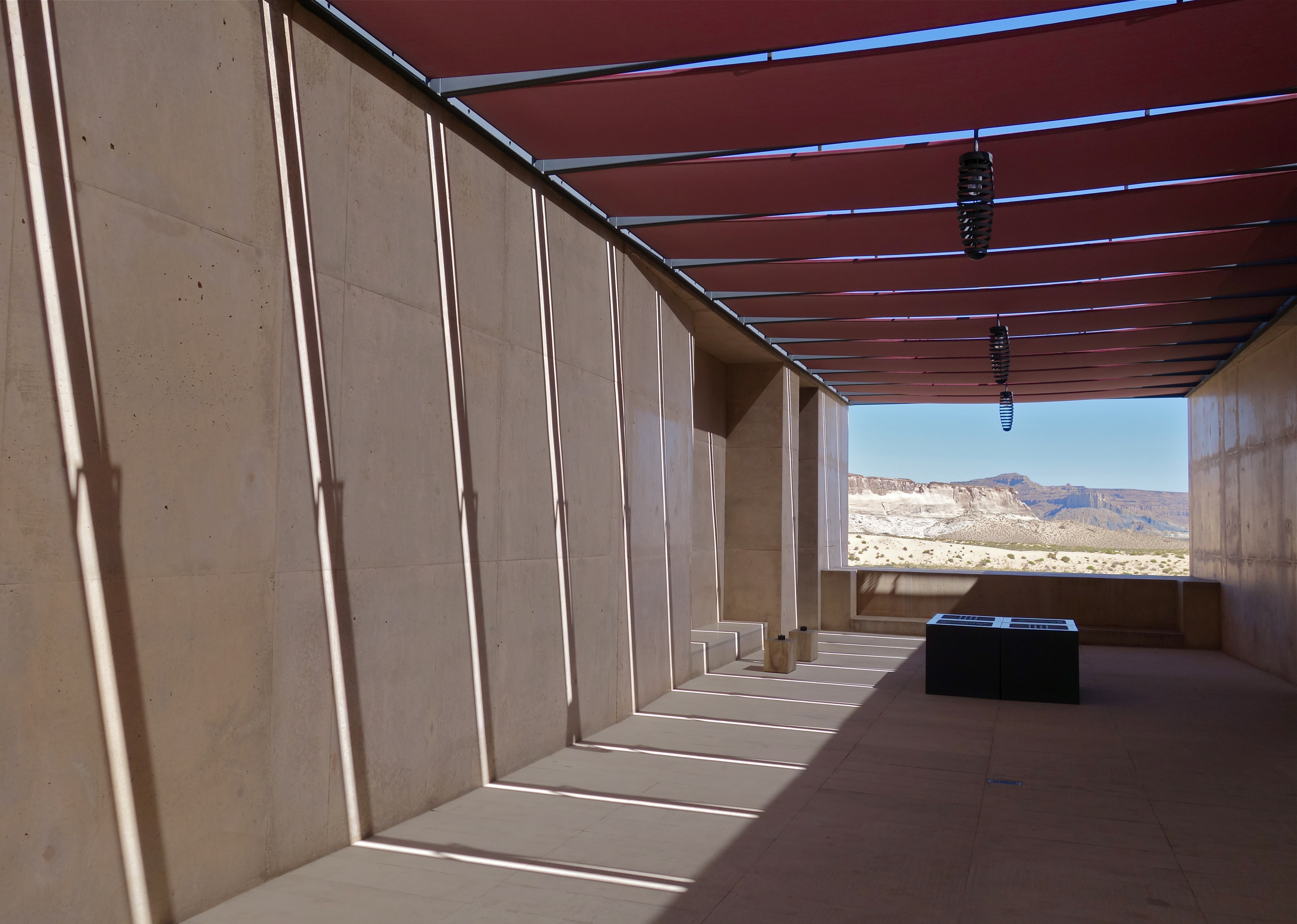
Entrance lounge

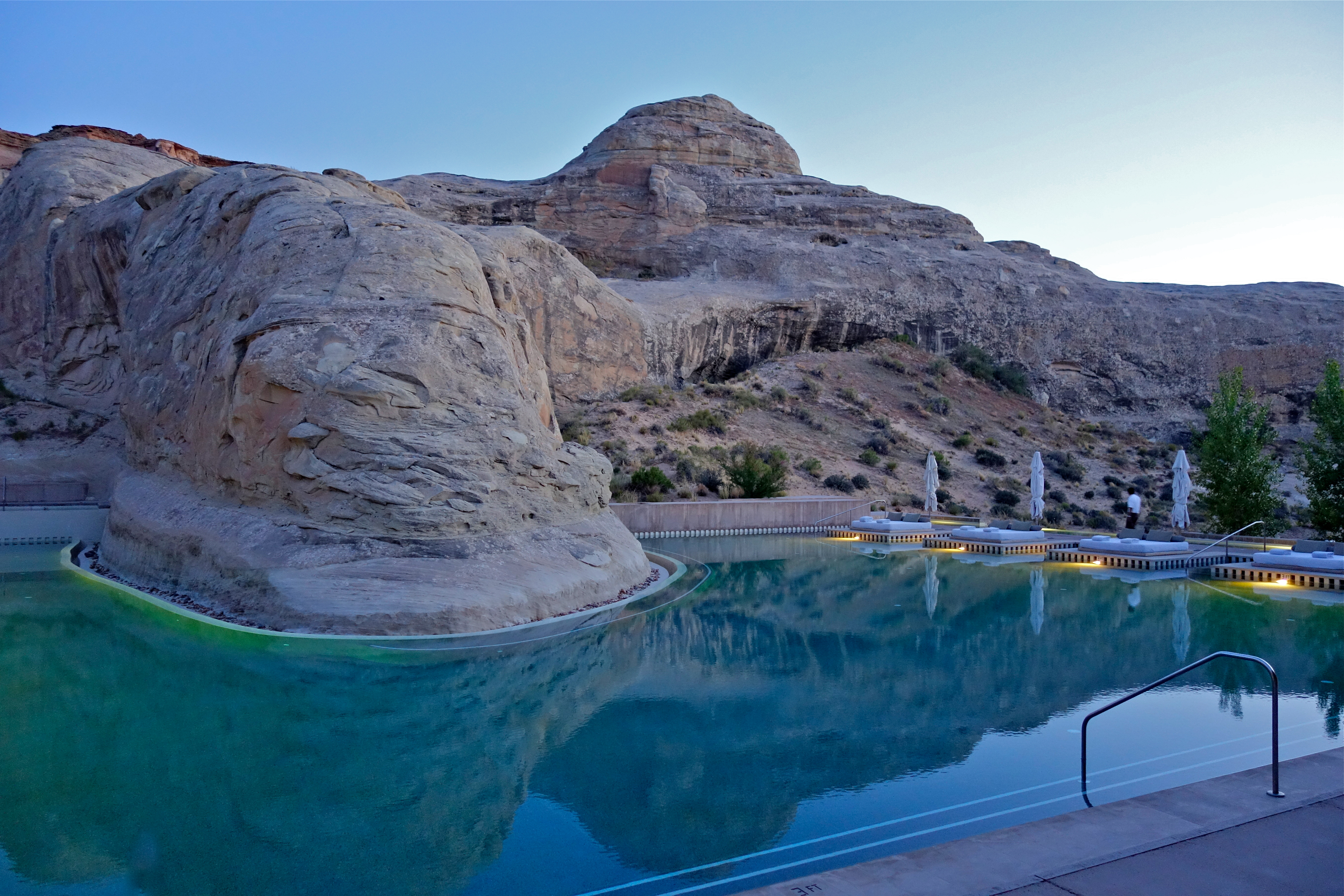
Main swimming pool

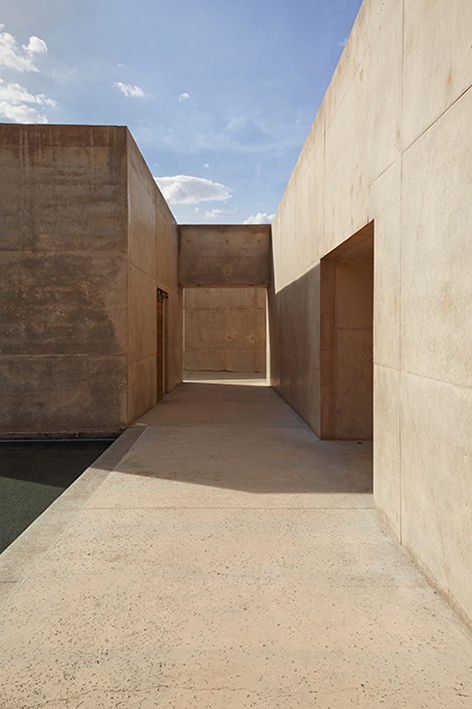

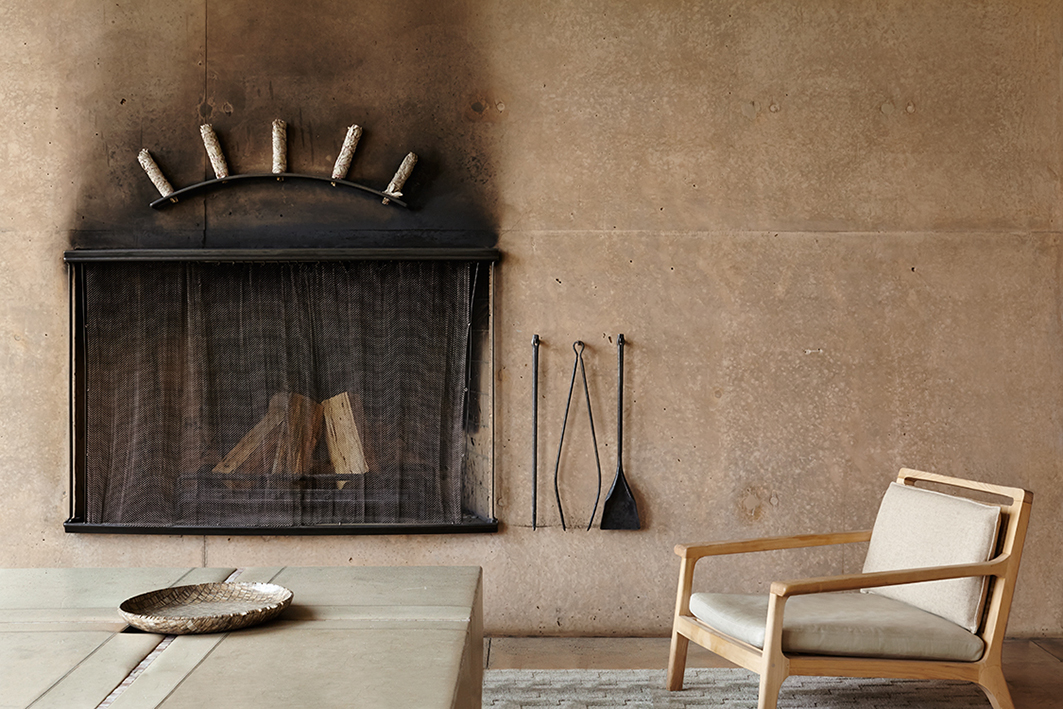

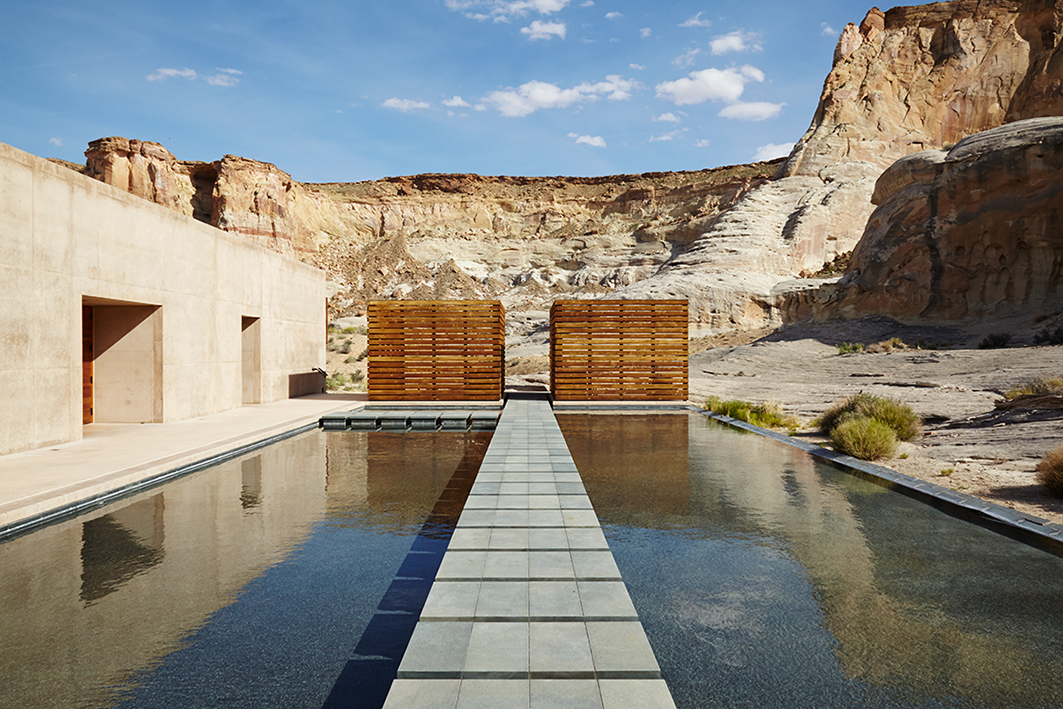
Spa reflection pool

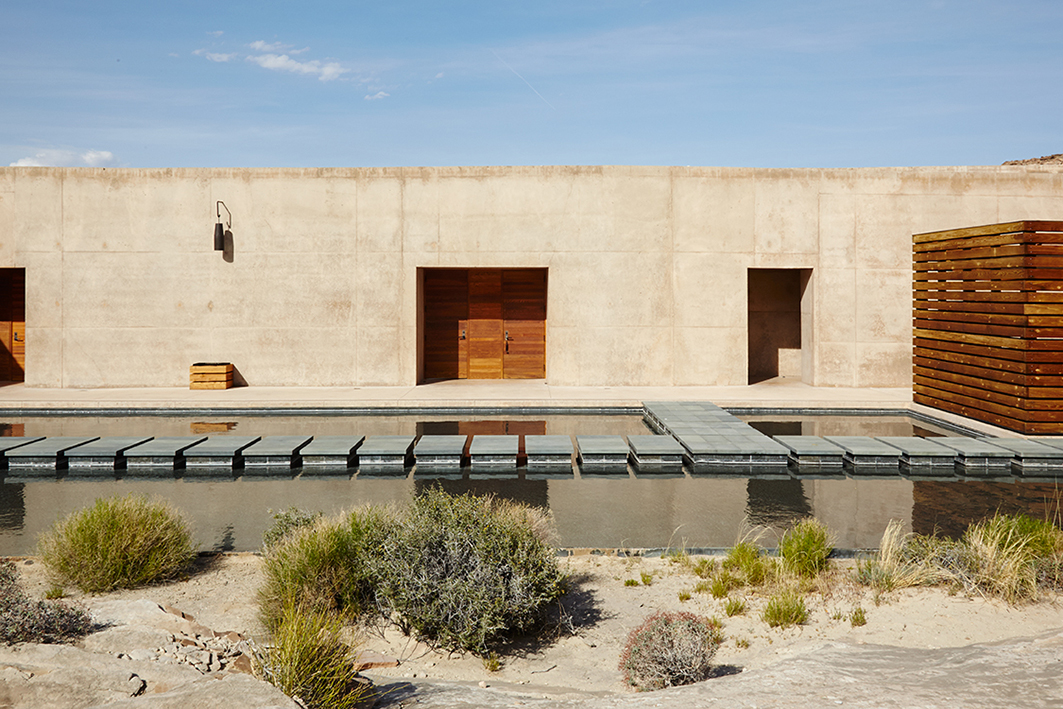
Spa reflection pool

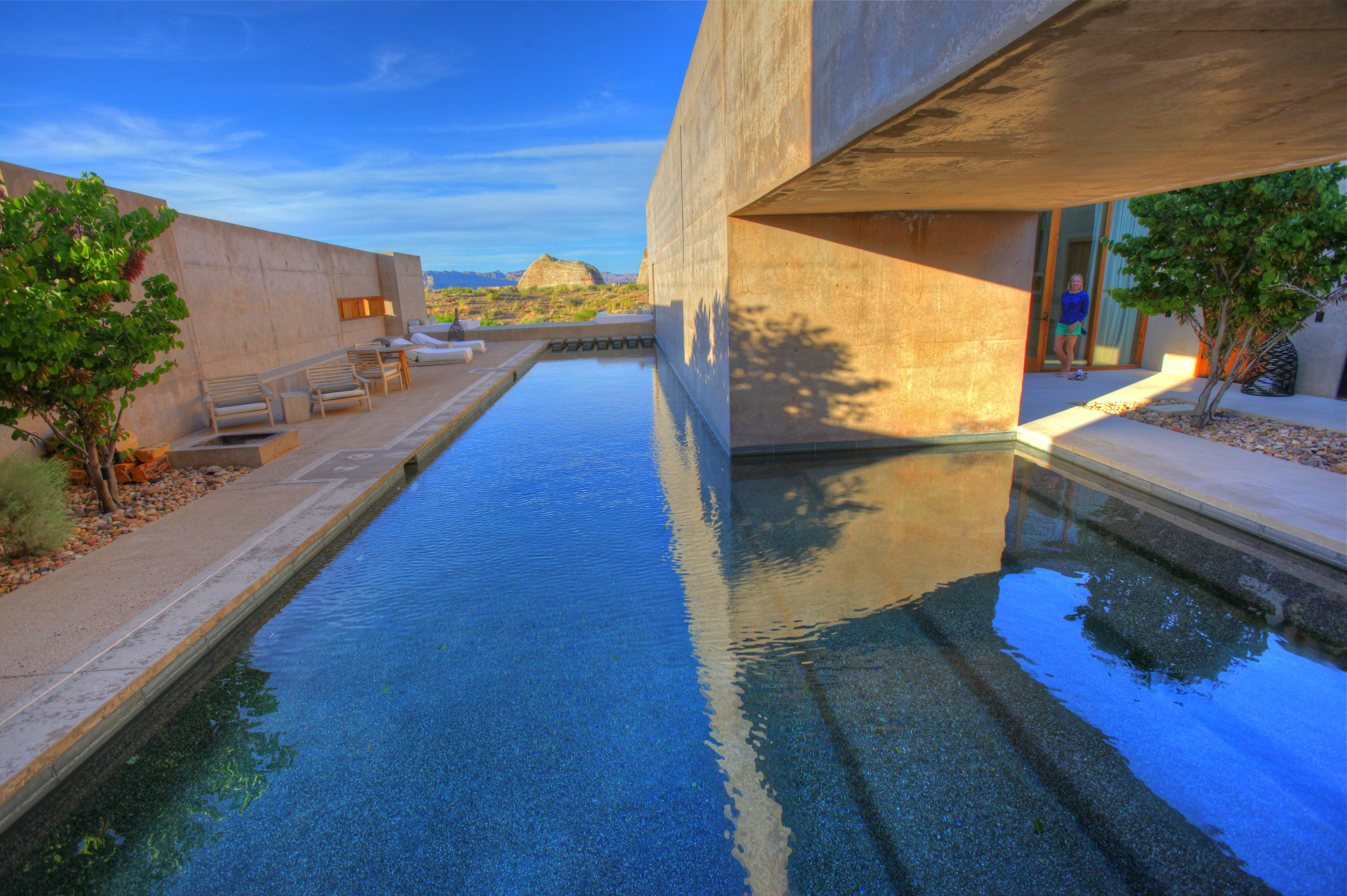
Amangiri Suite

There is via ferrata climbing, horseback riding, and other activities for guests on the property.

== Operation ==
The hotel is owned and operated by the Aman Resorts group. It employed 240 staff members as of 2020. Staff are instructed to memorize guests' names. Rooms were $3,500 per night during peak season as of 2021.

== Reception ==
The hotel has received positive critical reception. Reviewers praise it for having a serene aesthetic, sense of exclusivity, and a perceived connection to nature.

Romy Oltusky, writing for Harper's Bazaar, said it is "a surreal combination of extreme luxury and rugged wilderness, nestled in 600 acres of basically untouched Southwestern desert mountains (for people who want the wild experience but with 1000-thread count)."
