= Amanjena =

Hotel in Morocco

Coordinates: 31°36′32″N 7°55′59″W

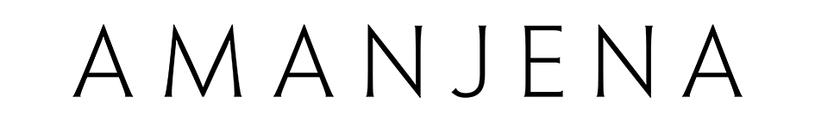
- Interactive map of the Amanjena area

General information
- Location: Marrakesh, Morocco
- Owner: Aman Resorts

Amanjena (lit. 'peaceful paradise') is a luxury hotel and resort in Palmeraie, a southeastern suburb of Marrakesh, Morocco. Built-in 2000, it was the first Aman Resort on the African continent. In May 2015, David Beckham celebrated his 40th birthday at the hotel.

== Background ==
Amanjena is situated in Marrakesh's Palmeraie, along the road to Ouarzazate, just outside Morocco's UNESCO-protected city of Marrakesh in an area where the river valleys of Draa and Dadès merge with the Sahara desert. The resort is set in the backdrop of a hill which rises to a height of 13,000 feet (4,000 m), in the surroundings of an olive orchard of the Almoravid period. There are views of the Atlas Mountains.

The 2010 movie Sex and the City 2 was filmed at Amanjena. In May 2015, David Beckham celebrated his 40th birthday at the hotel, along with guests Gordon Ramsay and Tana Ramsay, David Gardner and Liv Tyler, the Spice Girls, Eva Longoria, Tom Cruise, David Blaine, Guy Ritchie and Vanessa Feltz.

== Amanjena ==
Amanjena was designed by the architect Ed Tuttle, and was built over a period of two years. Tuttle was inspired by his trips across Morocco and southern Spain, with the Spanish Alhambra palace and 12th-century Menara Gardens purportedly being inspirations. and The Moorish architecture is in the Arabic/Moroccan traditional style, consisting of 32 pavilions and seven houses ("maisons"), with contemporary interiors. The design incorporates the Moorish building practice of pise, packed-earth structures, such as is incorporated in the nearby Berber village structures. The color scheme matches the Red City buildings of Marrakesh. The structure is of stone, pale peach in color, with pink, honey and sage green paint colors used throughout the building.

The massive entry door emulates that of an ancient Arab civilization. Amanjena has a very large lobby in the Moorish style, and features jade-coloured fountains. The lobby is patterned on the lines of a caravanserai, an Ogres suggestive of the Mezquita, the Mosque of Cordoba, with colonnades which open into waterfronts. Other features include sandy clay roofing, two-story lounges, internal patios which face fountains, arches, chiseled pillars, glazed Moroccan tiles, and a frieze of ziggurat design. Various decorating techniques are used, such as écaille de poisson for the zellige and plâtre ciselé for the walls.

The rooms are decorated with Berber rugs and lanterns and have high ceilings. Eight pavilions have their own private garden oasis and pool, while the other six offer views of the main pool. The dwellings are modeled after traditional Moroccan townhouses. A library and two restaurants are available at Amanjena. The main restaurant has a 6 metre (20 ft) high roof and 80 onyx pillars, while another restaurant serves Japanese cuisine. Aside from the large pool, there is a gym and a spa with a hammam, sauna, and steam room.
