= Ed Tuttle =

American architect and interior designer (1945–2020)

- Born: Edward Burnham Tuttle Jr. August 11, 1945; Seattle, Washington, US
- Died: June 21, 2020 (aged 74); Paris, France
- Education: University of Washington
- Occupation: Architect
- Notable work: Amanpuri; Amankila; Amanjiwo; Amanjena; Park Hyatt Milan; Park Hyatt Paris Vendome
- Partner: Christian Monges

Edward Burnham Tuttle Jr. (August 11, 1945 – June 21, 2020) was an American architect and interior designer best known for his works of hotel architecture. Among his most celebrated works is the Amanpuri hotel in Phuket, for which he was credited with setting a novel standard in resort design. Tuttle's design style has been described as simple, orderly and tranquil, and focusing on the comfort of a space. In 1977, he founded Design Realization in Paris, where he had been based until his death in 2020.

Tuttle and his firm kept a relatively low profile despite the considerable media recognition of his works; it was suggested that Tuttle's success as an architect may have relied on his discretion.

== Early life and education ==
Tuttle was born in Seattle, Washington, on August 11, 1945, to Edward Tuttle Sr. and his wife Ruth, then owners of a steel mill. He was descended from the designer of the Georgia State Capitol, architect Franklin Pierce Burnham, for whom he was named. He enrolled at the Portland State University to study interior design and architecture in 1963 and transferred to the University of Oregon before later graduating from the University of Washington in 1968. At Washington, his studies were influenced by the works of modernist architects Mies van der Rohe and Frank Lloyd Wright, and primarily focused on the latter's renowned work, Fallingwater in Pennsylvania.

Following his graduation in 1968, he briefly worked at the design studio of the San Francisco-based department store, Gump's. Whilst there, through a colleague, he assisted in designing the house of a member of the Pritzker family, owners of the Hyatt Corporation and founders of the Pritzker Architecture Prize.

== Early career ==
In 1968, following his brief stint in San Francisco, he joined Dale Keller and Associates in Hong Kong, who were responsible for the designs of Mumbai's Taj Mahal Hotel and the Hong Kong Regent. With the Kellers, Tuttle assisted in the design of several villas on the Saronic islands of Hydras and Mykonos in Greece, and later worked on the winter palace of Iranian Shah Reza Pahlavi on Kish Island shortly before the Iranian Revolution of 1978.

In 1977, Tuttle relocated to Saint-Germain-des-Prés, Paris, and established the architectural firm, Design Realization Ltd., which he ran together with his colleague and partner, Christian Monges. Despite settling in France, he continued to travel frequently for the next decade to oversee various private residential and hospitality projects worldwide. His pattern of travel later led to Tuttle being dubbed by several books and magazines as a "Livingstone of modern times" after Scottish explorer, David Livingstone.

In 1981, Tuttle updated the design of Villa Batujimbar in Bali; the villa had been the personal residence of Indonesian-hotelier Adrian Zecha, who he first met in Hong Kong. The renovation led to the creation of black-tiled pools, which later spurred a trend of such pools throughout the tropics. Villa Batujimbar became the precursor project that led to his long term cooperation with Zecha.

== Hotel projects ==
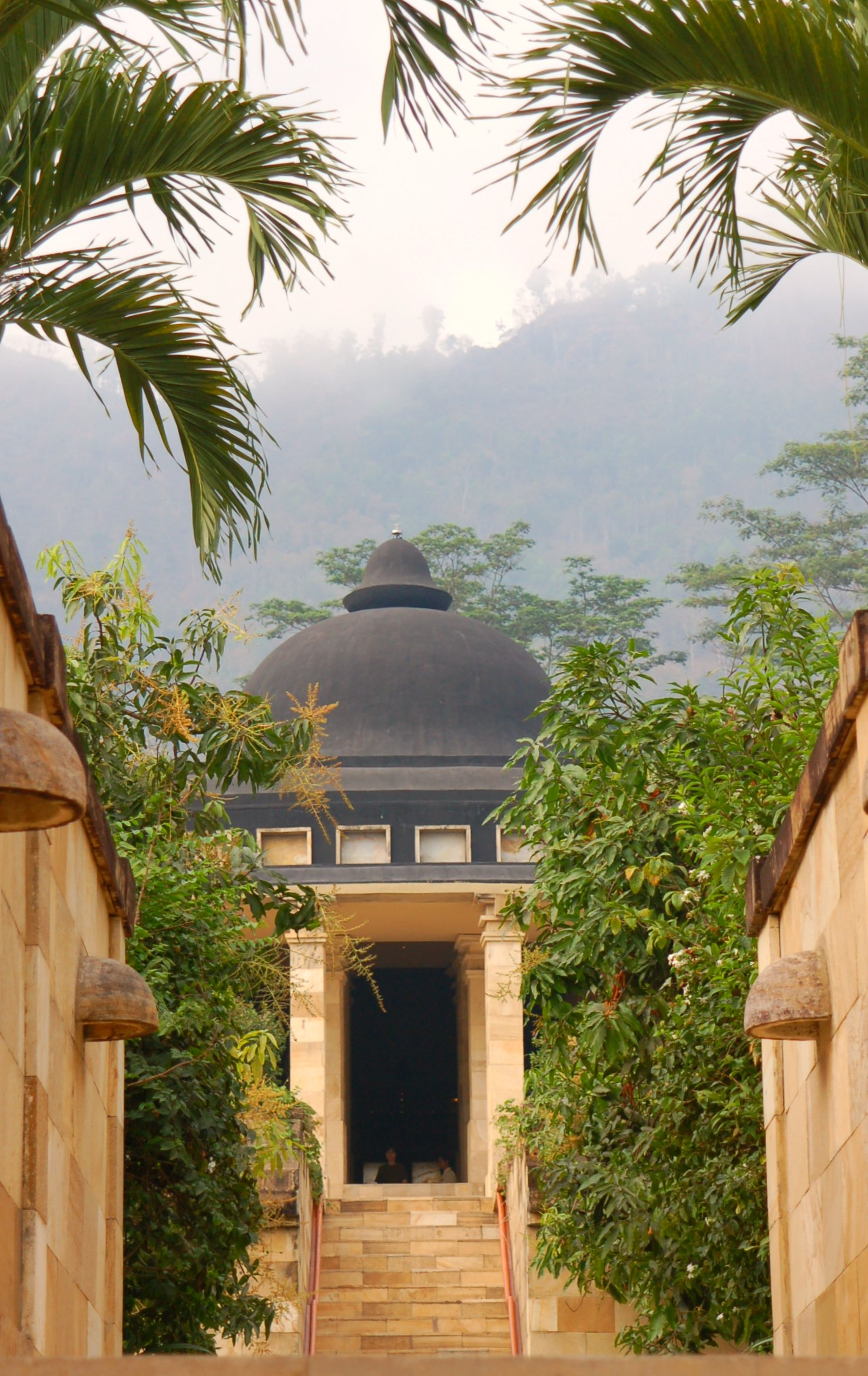
Amanjiwo (1997) near Yogyakarta, Indonesia

Tuttle's projects for Aman Resorts has been credited to define the hotel group's calm design style. His works for the chain garnered considerable media attention and had been featured on numerous books on architecture and design. His designs, as part of Aman Resorts' larger portfolio had been claimed to have significantly changed hospitality design, and influenced the works of other hospitality architects like Bill Bensley.

In 1986, Adrian Zecha hired Tuttle to design a resort on a coconut grove on Phuket's Pansea beach in Thailand. He studied Thai traditional architecture and classical teak houses before designing the hotel; this pattern of local cultural sensitivity continued with his ensuing projects. The project's design claimed to capture the essence of Thai design and prioritised a design that was liveable; markedly an antithesis to other luxury hotels of the day. Tuttle attributed his approach to prioritise the location's cultural context and the structure's impact to the surrounding environment; it was reported that Tuttle elected to build around the coconut trees on the site's grove instead of cutting them down. The 30-room resort opened in 1988 as Amanpuri, receiving significant media coverage on the hotel's radical form and original style; it became frequently credited as a template for future luxury hotels worldwide despite not advertising. Following the completion of Amanpuri, Tuttle developed a persisting friendship with Zecha, which led to his long term cooperation with the hotel chain.

In 1991, he and Australian architect, Kerry Hill collaborated in the design of the Sukhothai Hotel in Bangkok, Thailand. More hotel-related projects ensued in 1992, with the opening of Amankila in Bali and Le Melezin in Courchevel. The former, designed and built onto a cliffside met similarly much praise from various design critics. In 2003, Tuttle designed the interiors of the Park Hyatt hotel in Milan, occupying a 130-year-old former office building. Tuttle's design for the hotel was featured in an article in The New York Times. Tuttle continued designing hotels with Aman up until 2012, marked by the opening of the Amanzoe resort in Ermionida, Greece.

== Later career and life ==
Later in his life, he designed the outdoor dining pavilion at Golden Rock Inn on Nevis, St. Kitts and Nevis, owned by artists Helen and Brice Marden, old friends of Tuttle's; he reportedly refused payment for the design. In 2009, Tuttle's name was included in Architectural Digest's 2010 AD100 list, which recognises influential interior designers and architects around the world.

In 2019, Tuttle's name was mentioned as part of the widely published contact book of American financier and sexual offender Jeffrey Epstein, along with fellow designers and architects, Muriel Brandolini, Jean-Michel Gathy, Ricardo Legorreta, Peter Marino, and David Rockwell. Tuttle's architecture practice had designed the main-house on Epstein's 70-acre island, Little Saint James, in the U.S. Virgin Islands in 2003. His name was also mentioned in Epstein's flight logs, containing lists of alleged passengers who have travelled Epstein's personal jet; the document received significant media attention following its publication in 2019.

Tuttle continued living in France with Christian Monges, a lawyer with whom he had been in a relationship. Tuttle died in Saint-Germain-des-Prés, Paris on 21 June 2020 of a brain tumour.

== Selected works ==
- Amanpuri, Phuket, Thailand (1988)
- Sukhothai Hotel, Bangkok (1991)
- Amankila, Bali, Indonesia (1992)
- Le Melezin, Courchevel, France (1992)
- Amanjiwo, Magelang, Indonesia (1997)
- Amangani, Jackson Hole, Wyoming (1998)
- Amanjena, Marrakesh, Morocco (2000)
- Park Hyatt Hotel, Milan, Italy (2003)
- Amanbagh, Rajashtan, India (2005)
- Park Hyatt Vendome, Paris, France (2002)
- Amanzoe, Ermionida, Greece (2016)

== Gallery of works ==
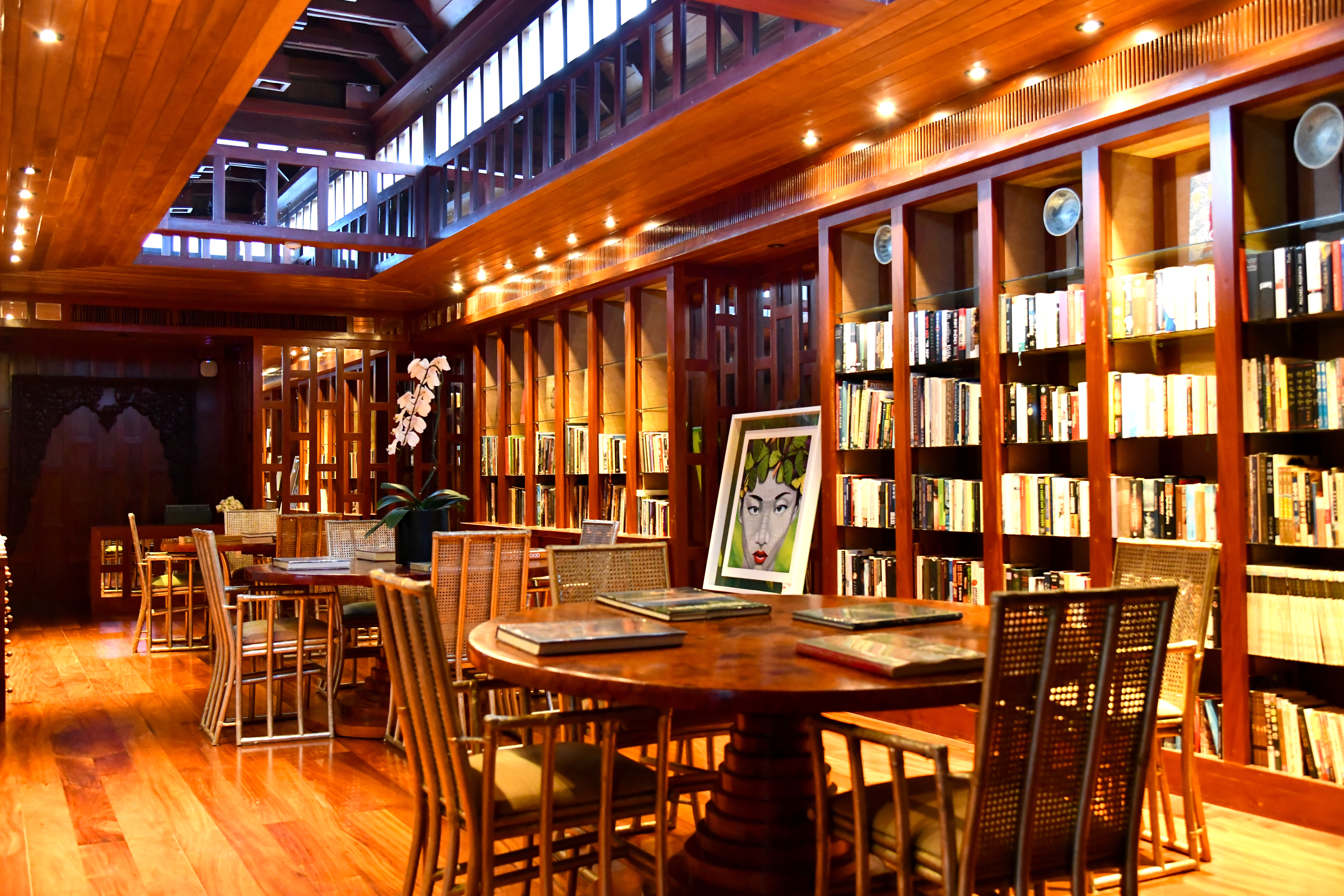
Library at Amanpuri (1988)

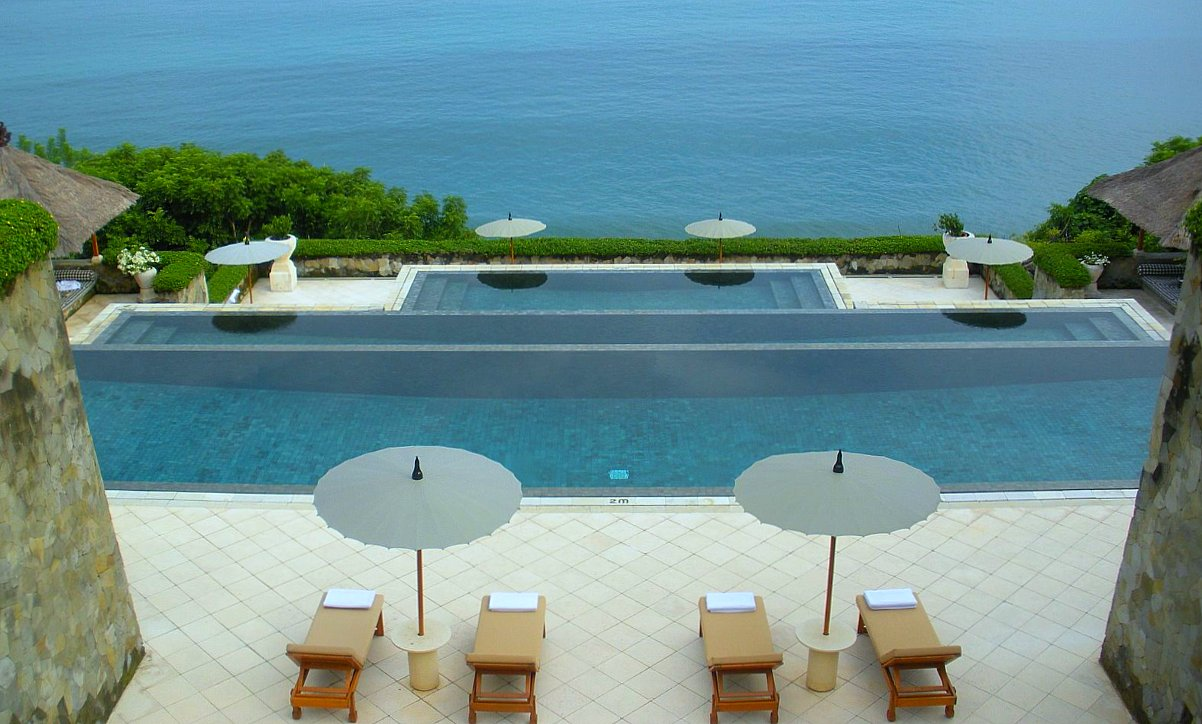
Amankila (1992)

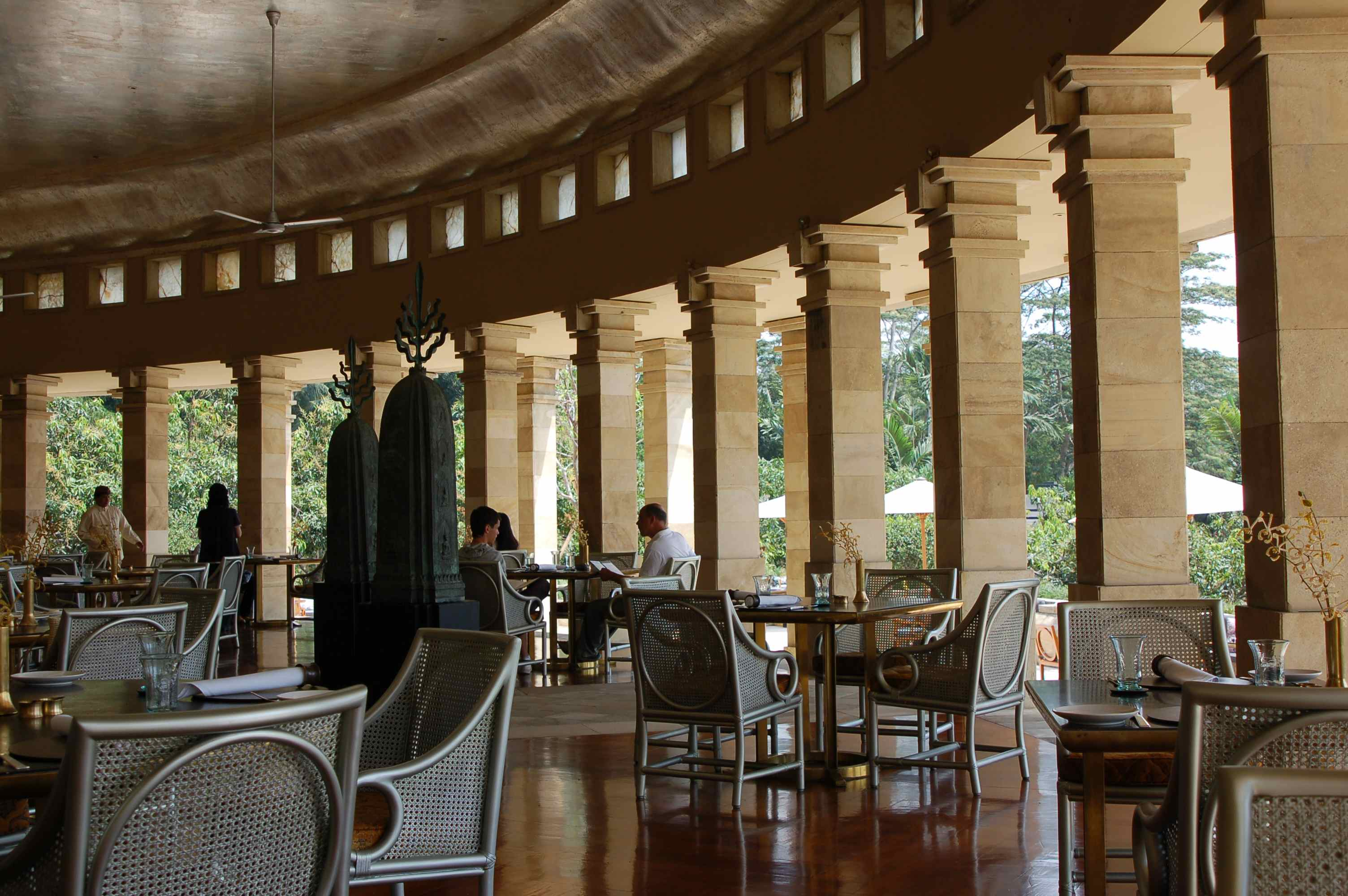
Amanjiwo (1997)

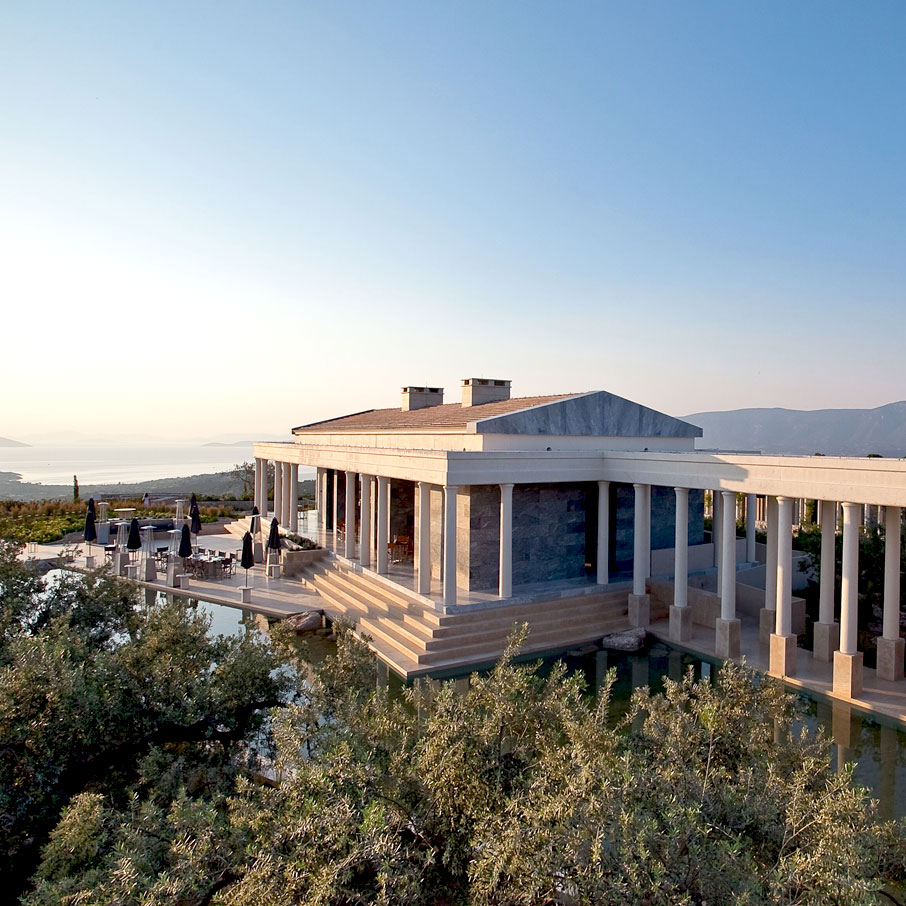
Amanzoe (2012)

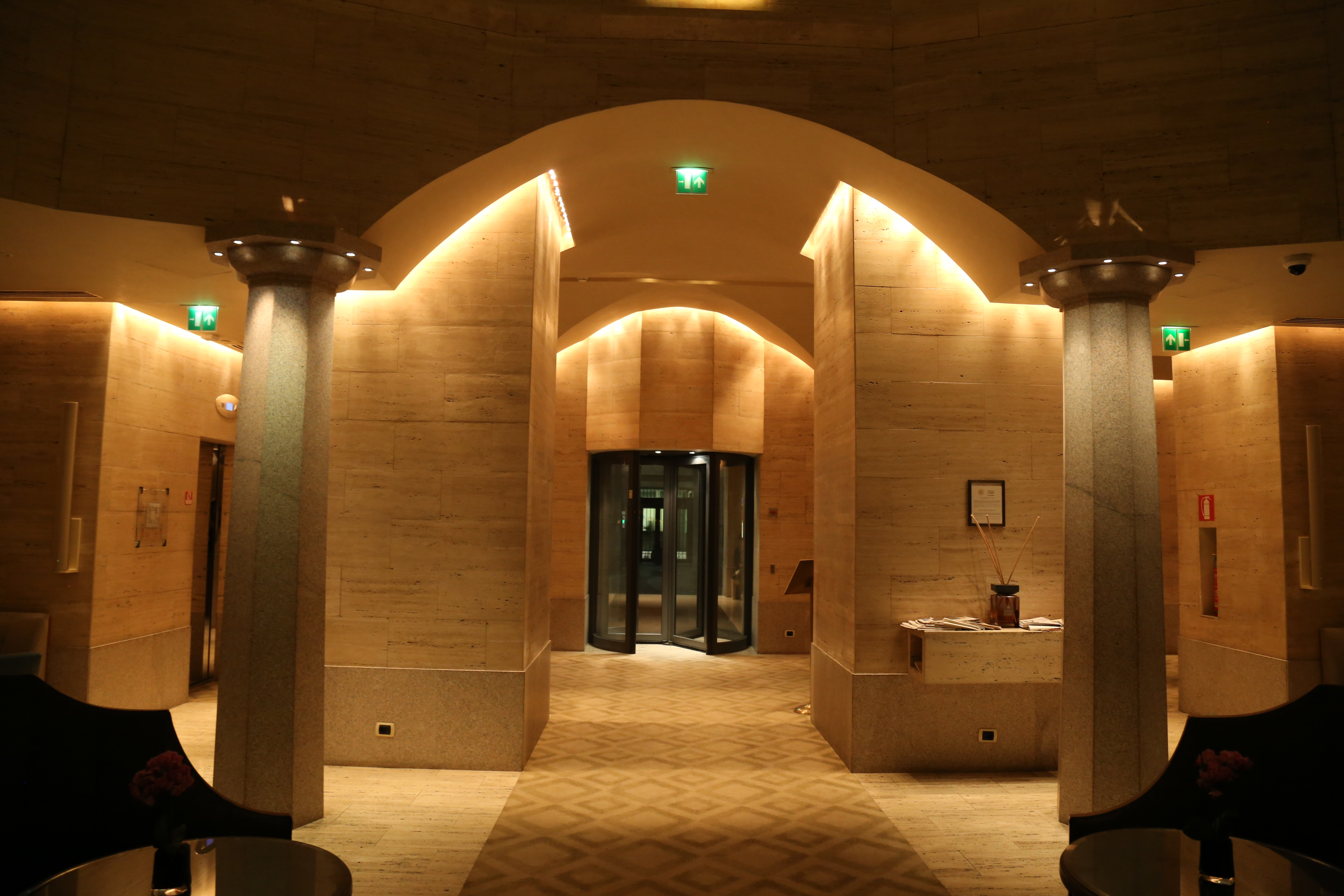
Park Hyatt Milan (2003)
