= Amanjiwo =

Hotel in Indonesia

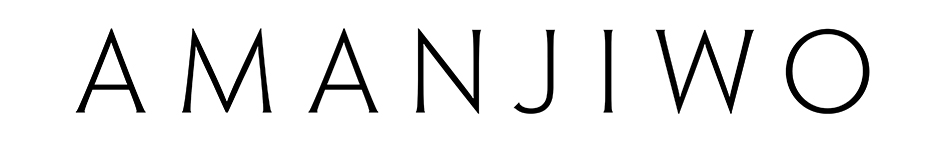

- Location within Java

General information
- Location: Magelang, Indonesia
- Coordinates: 7°37′55″S 110°12′9″E
- Opening: 1997
- Owner: Aman Resorts
- Management: Aman Resorts

Design and construction
- Architect: Ed Tuttle

Other information
- Number of suites: 36

Amanjiwo is a five star luxury hotel in the Menoreh Hills near Magelang, Central Java, Indonesia. It lies opposite the 9th century Buddhist sanctuary and UNESCO World Heritage Site, Borobudur. It is owned and operated by Aman Resorts and was opened on 16 October 1997. The name "Amanjiwo" means "peaceful soul".

== Architecture ==
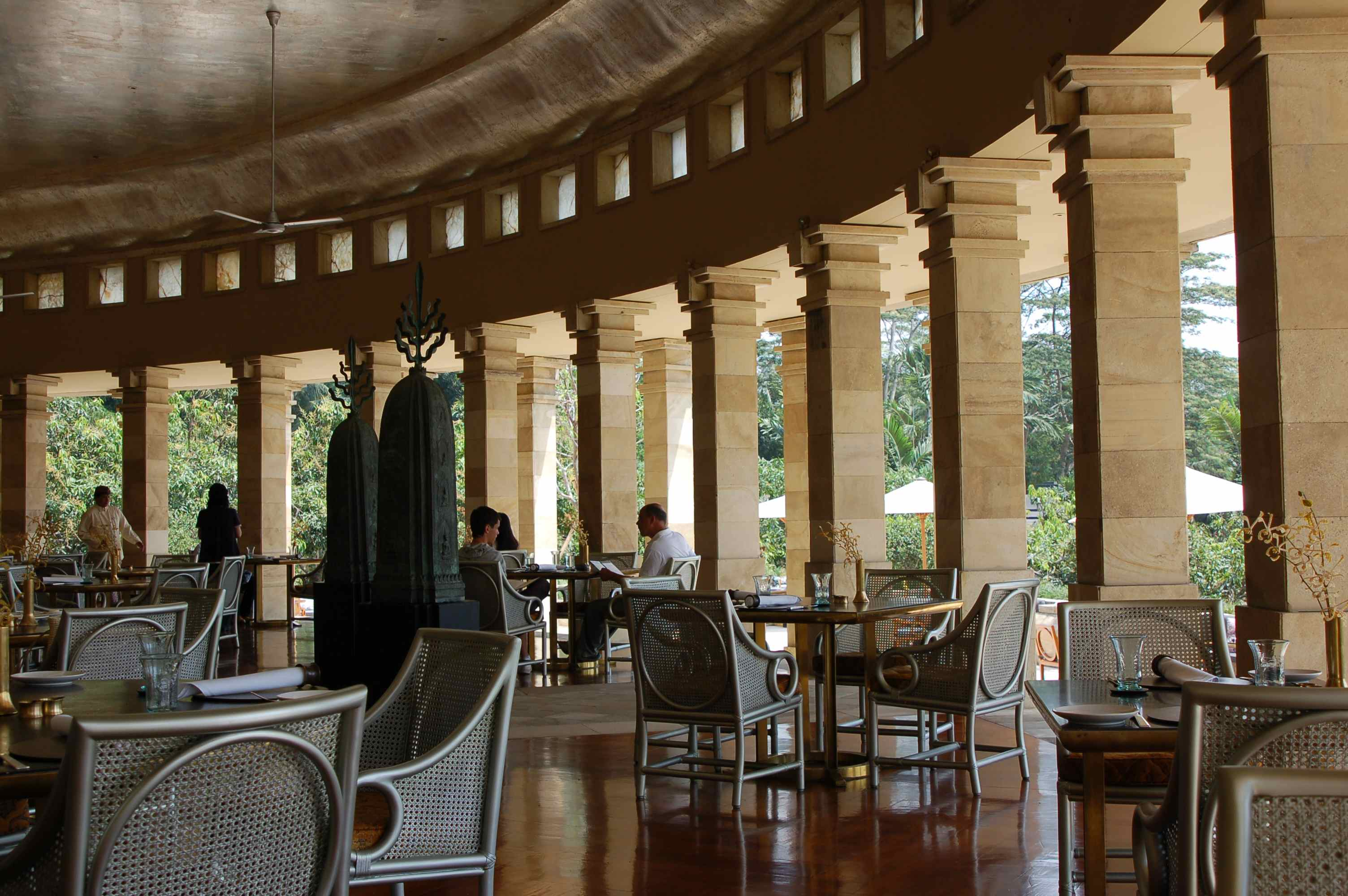
The hotel restaurant

The hotel was designed by Ed Tuttle and is built in the form of a pillared temple from local coral-beige limestone (paras yogya) and 15 of the rooms have private pools. The hotel has its own library (which often hosts lectures on the history of Java and its temples), art gallery, Javanese spa and a swimming pool with Javanese green tiles, known as hijau danau, set into the rice fields. The main pool measures 40 metres (130 foot) in length. The hotel has 36 lavish suites, laid out in two crescents around the central rotunda. The suites (that measure between 243 and 1200 sqm) have limestone walls, domed roofs (some are thatched), high ceilings, terrazzo flooring, sliding glass doors, a central four-pillar bed, sungkai wood screens, coconut wood and rattan furniture, old batik pillows, and traditional glass paintings. The seven Garden Pool Suites and seven Borobudur Pool Suites each overlook their own private pool. Bathrooms run the length of all suites and include twin terrazzo-finished vanities and outdoor sunken tubs set in walled gardens. Many of the rooms have portraits of notable Indonesian people on them or traditional carvings. The rooms range from $850–$3,500 a night, excluding 21% tax.

The main restaurant to the hotel is crescent shaped and open-aired, supported by neoclassical columns. It serves Indonesian and Western cuisines. A circular black marble bar is located in the lobby and featured Gamelan players and local girls performing traditional Javanese dance every day.

== Recognition ==
The hotel won La Dolce Vita Magazine's Best of the Best and a bronze award by the Hotel Inspector Awards in 2010.

== Gallery ==
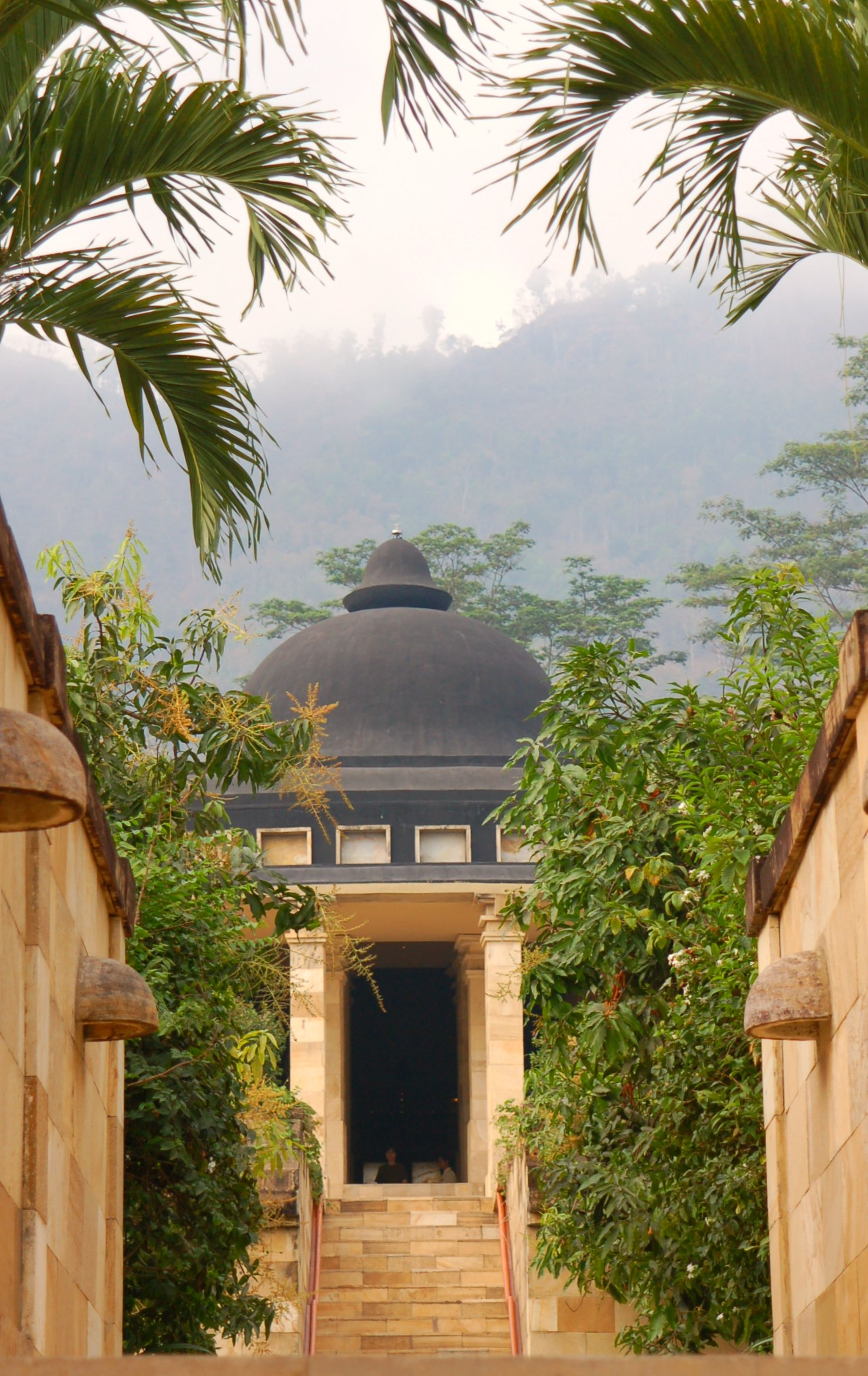

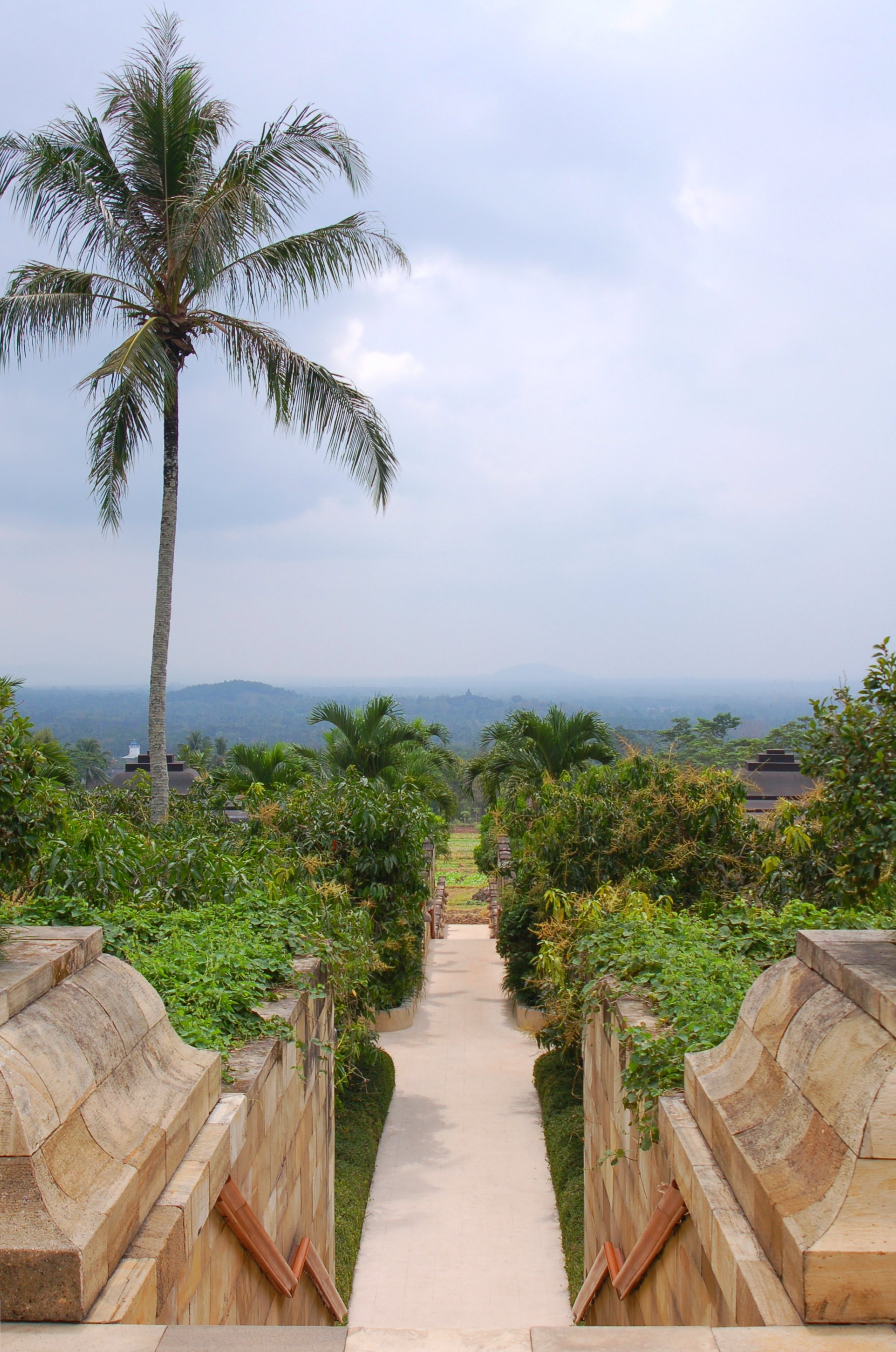

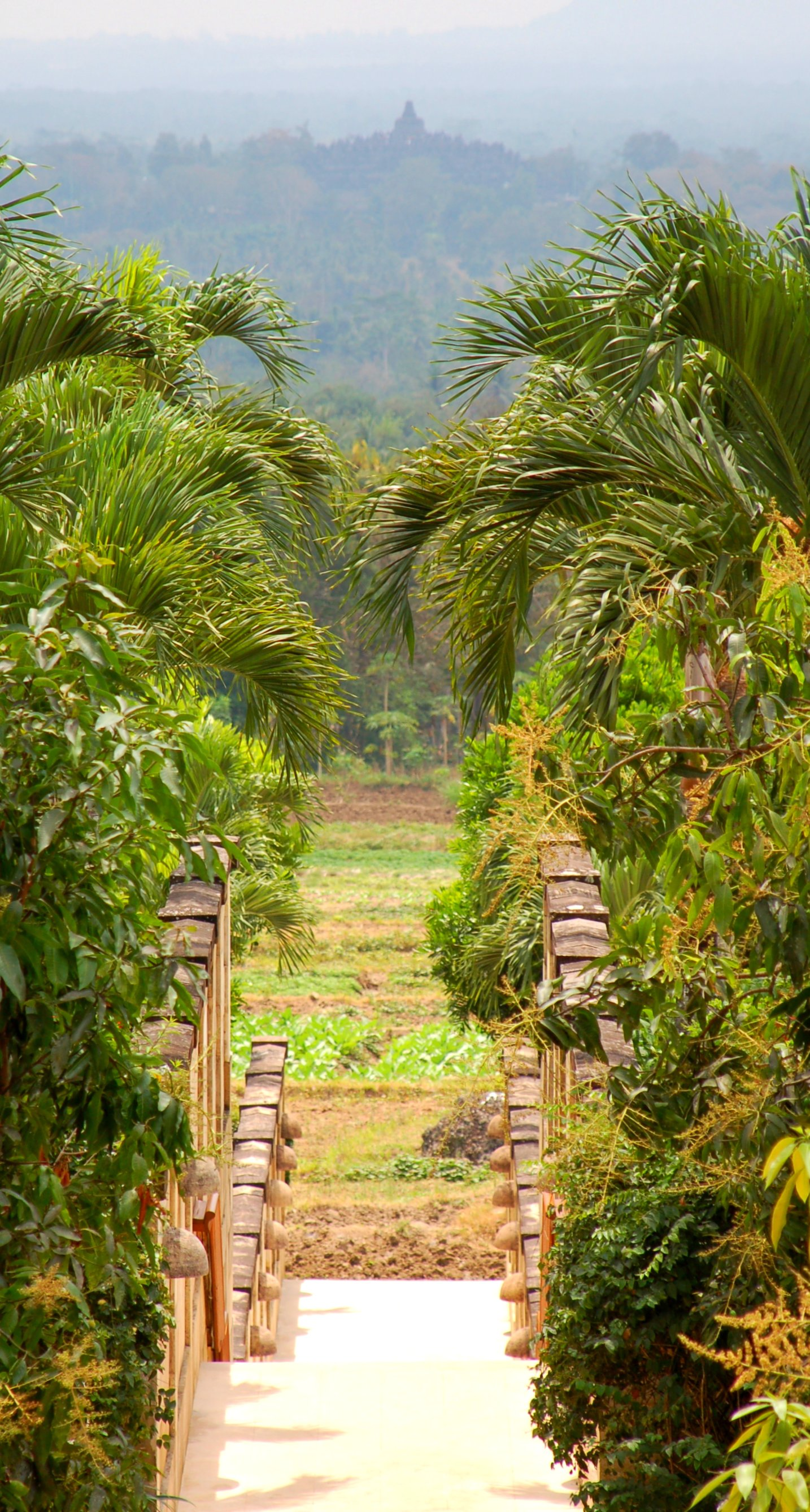

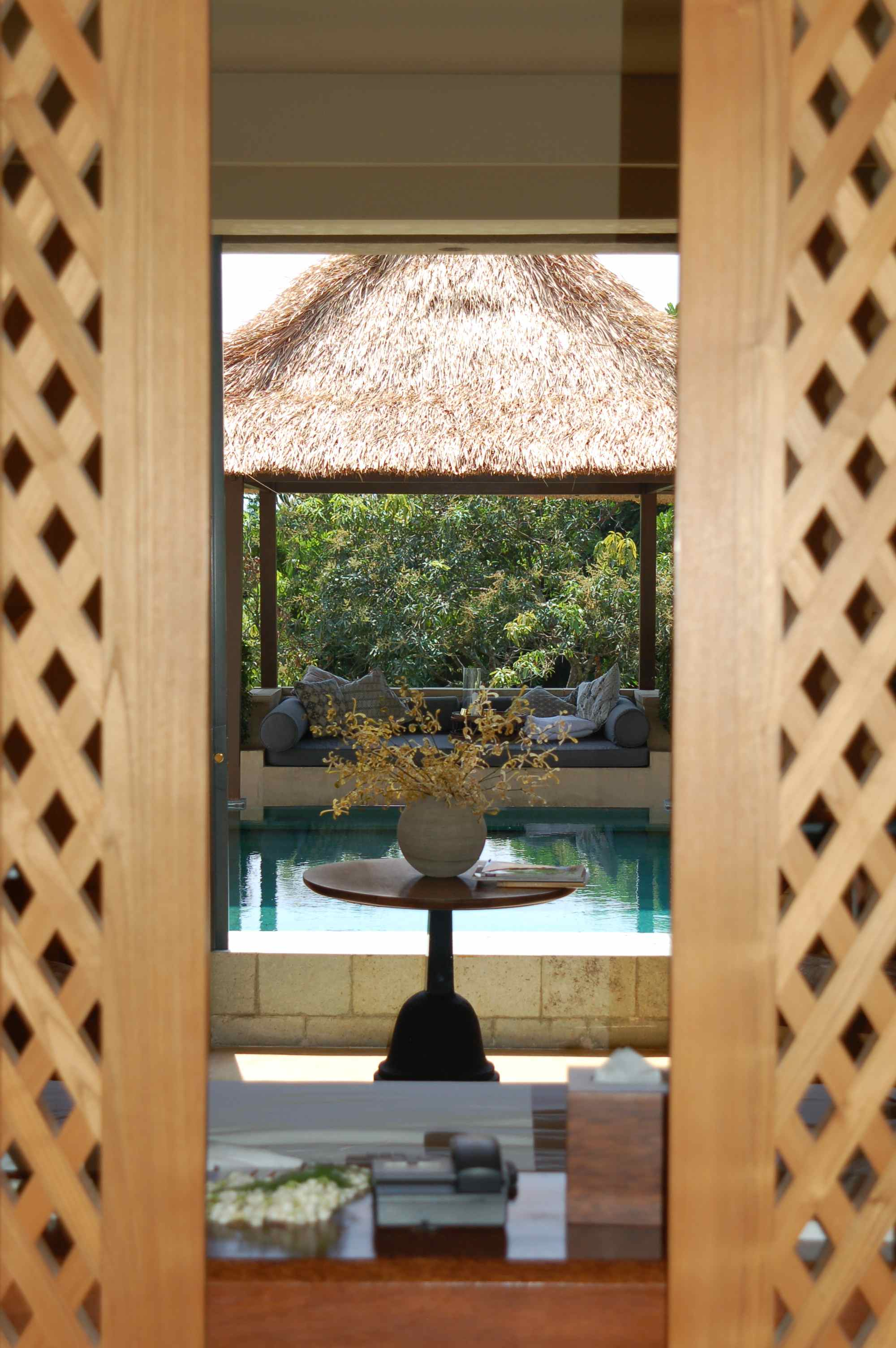
