= The Lodhi =

Indian luxury hotel

Coordinates: 28.59206°N 77.23827°E

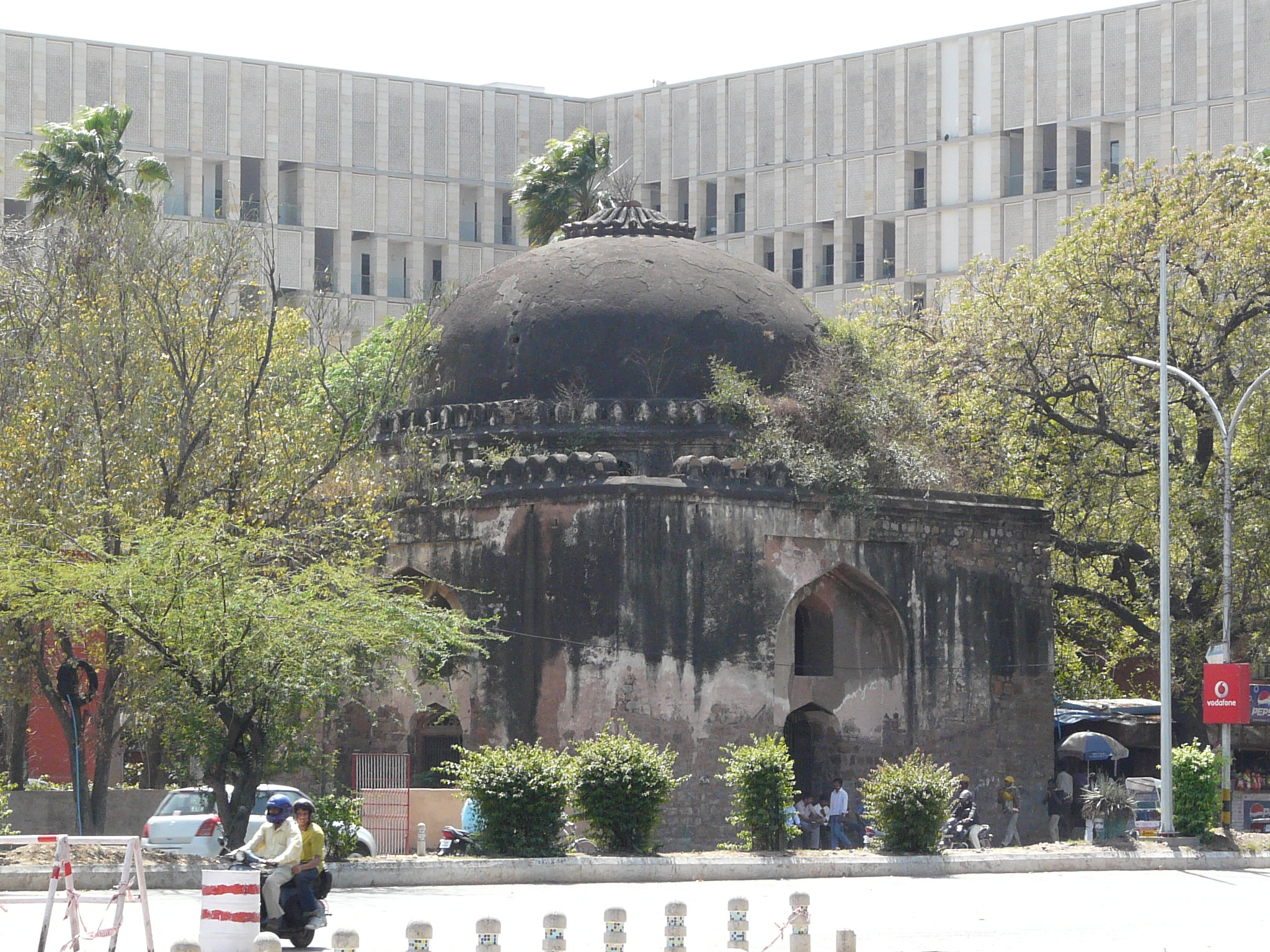
The Lodhi in the background of Gol Gumbaz

The Lodhi is an Indian luxury hotel located in Lutyens' Delhi. The property is spread across seven acres near the Lodi Gardens, which is at the centre of the Indian capital city. It is one of the two Indian hotels among The Leading Hotels of the World (the other being The Imperial). The Lodhi is often ranked as one of the top hotels in India and Asia. It is also known for its Indian Accent restaurant.

== History ==
Originally known as Aman New Delhi, the hotel was owned and operated by the India Tourism Development Corporation. In early 2000s, Adrian Zecha-led Aman Resorts acquired the property and rebuilt it with the help of Australian architect Kerry Hill. In 2014, Delhi Land and Finance sold its entire stake with Aman Resorts save for the hotel. It rechristened it to The Lodhi.

== See also ==
- List of hotels in Delhi
