= Indian Accent (restaurant) =

Restaurant in New Delhi, India

Coordinates: 28.5917°N 77.2385°E

General information
- Location: 123 West 56th Street, New York; The Lodhi, Lodhi Road, New Delhi; NMACC, BKC, Bandra East, Mumbai
- Town or city: New York City, New Delhi, Mumbai
- Country: United States, India
- Owner: Rohit Khattar

Website
- www.indianaccent.com

Indian Accent is a restaurant located at The Lodhi hotel in New Delhi, India. It was established in 2009 by Rohit Khattar. It has outposts in New York City and Mumbai.

Indian Accent ran operations at The Manor hotel for eight years, before moving to The Lodhi in 2017.

== Chef ==
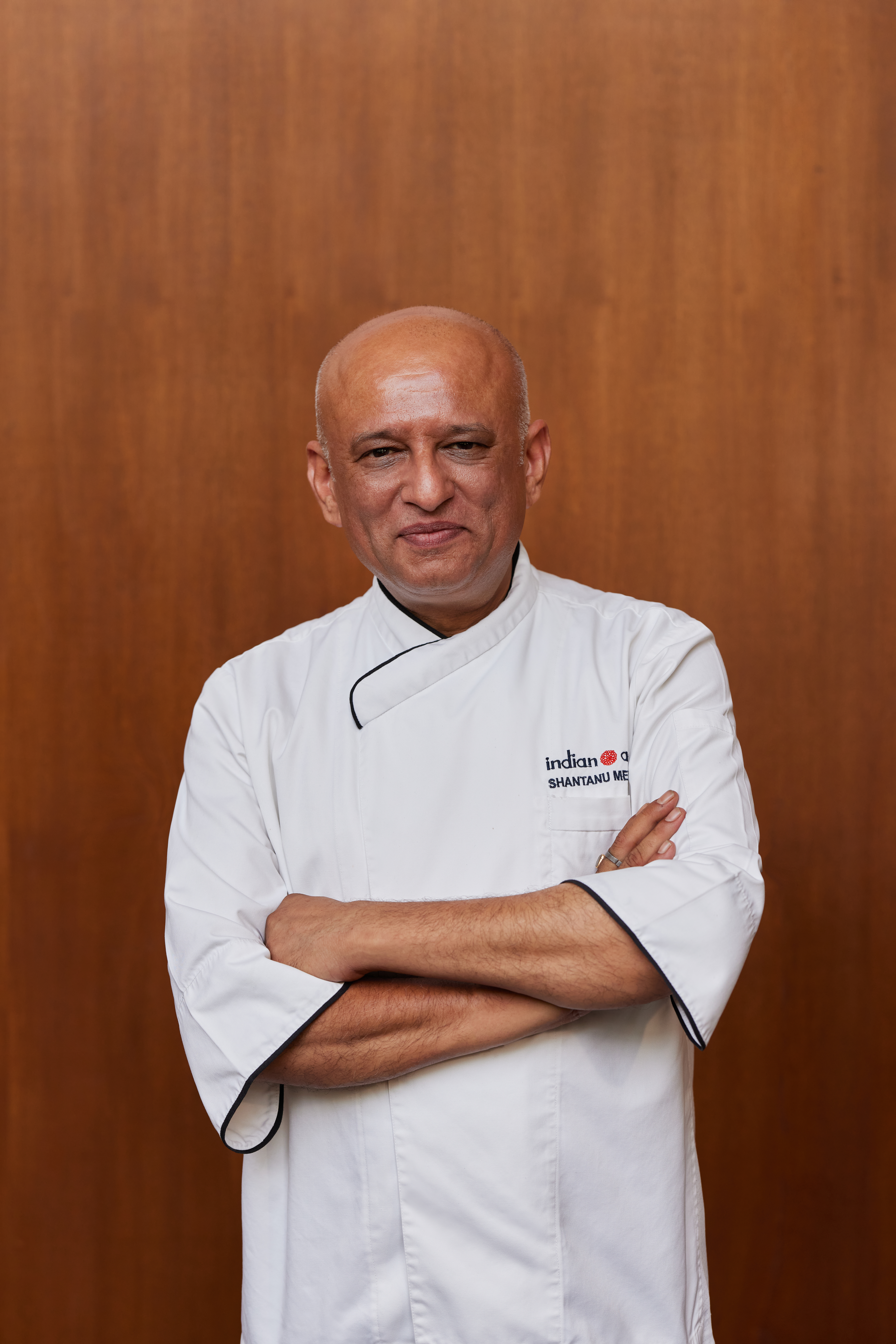
Chef Shantanu Mehrotra

The restaurant is known for its modern Indian cuisine, currently supervised by chef Shantanu Mehrotra, who describes the cuisine as "inventive Indian". He has been Executive Chef of Indian Accent since 2009.

== Menu ==
The restaurant "showcases inventive Indian cuisine by complementing the flavors and traditions of India with global ingredients and techniques". It offers staple, traditional Indian dishes with a contemporary, "cosmopolitan twang", as described by The New York Times. Some of its most renowned dishes are Puchkas with Calcutta Jhal Potato & Five Waters, Potato Sphere Chaat with White Pea Ragda and the Meetha Aachar Spare Ribs with Sour Green Apple.

== Cookbook ==
The Indian Accent Restaurant Cookbook is available for purchase at the restaurant and is based on the menu designed by chef Manish Mehrotra. It showcases a culmination of "local produce", "home-style cooking", and "unusual ingredients from around the world." The cookbook's photographs are captured by Indian food photographer Rohit Chawla and was launched at the Jaipur Literature Festival in 2017.

== Criticism ==
In September 2024, ethical concerns on price point and "integrity" were raised on Indian Accent's Delhi outlet by a customer who accused it of replacing morels with cheaper button mushrooms. The restaurant responded by saying it was a misunderstanding.

== Awards ==
The restaurant has won various accolades over the years. The New Delhi outpost was voted the number one restaurant in India by Conde Nast Traveller and has been on Asia’s 50 Best Restaurants list since 2013. It is on the World’s 50 Best Restaurants list of 2024. In 2018, it was recognized by TIME as one of the world’s 100 greatest places. It was also voted as the number one restaurant in India by La Liste in 2024.
