= Costa Palmas =

Luxury resort community in Baja California Sur, Mexico

Coordinates: 23°36′36″N 109°35′27″W

General information
- Location: La Ribera, Los Cabos, Baja California Sur, Mexico
- Construction started: 2014
- Completed: October 1, 2019 (Four Seasons)
- Owner: Irongate (Martell Capital Group LLC)
- Affiliation: Four Seasons Hotels and Resorts; Aman Resorts

Technical details
- Grounds: 1,500 acres (610 ha)

Costa Palmas is a luxury tourism and residential resort community in La Ribera, municipality of Los Cabos, Baja California Sur, Mexico. It covers roughly 1,500 acres (607 hectares) along the Gulf of California, with three kilometers of beachfront. The Los Angeles-based firm Irongate (Martell Capital Group LLC) built and operates it through its Mexican subsidiary Desarrolladora La Ribera, S. de R.L. de C.V. The complex has hotels under the Four Seasons and Aman brands, private residences, a marina, a golf course, and commercial areas.

== Background and location ==
The site was formerly Cabo Riviera, a resort development that collapsed during the 2008 financial crisis. Irongate bought it in May 2014 and relaunched it as Costa Palmas.

The property sits in the East Cape region, about 45 minutes from Los Cabos International Airport and 26 kilometers from Cabo Pulmo National Park, a federal protected area and UNESCO World Heritage Site.

== Components ==
=== Four Seasons Resort and Residences Los Cabos ===
The Four Seasons Resort and Residences Los Cabos opened October 1, 2019, with 141 rooms and 23 suites. Exterior architecture is by Guerin Glass Architects. The resort has several pools, a spa, a sports center, and dining venues, and is the only Four Seasons property with a private marina on its grounds.

=== Amanvari Resort and Residences ===
Amanvari, set to open August 1, 2026, is the first Aman hotel in Mexico and the sixth in the Americas and Caribbean. The name joins the Sanskrit words for "peace" and "water". It will have 18 casitas, private branded residences, restaurants serving Italian, Japanese, and locally inspired cuisine, and a spa with a temazcal and open-air yoga pavilion.

=== Marina Costa Palmas ===
The complex has a private marina projected to hold around 250 berths for large vessels once finished. It is the only Four Seasons property with a private marina on its grounds.

=== Golf course ===
The 18-hole course was laid out by Robert Trent Jones II along the Gulf of California coast, running through the development's orchards and gardens.

=== Dining ===
Restaurants at the complex include Estiatorio Milos by chef Costas Spiliadis and Mozza Baja, drawn from Nancy Silverton's concept. In 2024, French chef Ludo Lefebvre announced he would open a restaurant at Costa Palmas.

=== Other components ===
The development also has a Beach and Yacht Club, a polo field, a deep-water marina, and around 18 acres of orchards and organic farms that supply the resort's restaurants, according to the Financial Times.

== Business model ==
According to a 2022 report by Carlos Velázquez in Dinero en Imagen, the development had by then invested over 800 million United States dollars, was generating around 700 direct jobs through Four Seasons and 1,000 more across the complex, and was selling residences and lots ranging from 4 to 30 million United States dollars.

About 90 percent of residence owners are United States citizens, the Financial Times reported.

== Controversies ==
=== Buyer litigation ===
From 2023 onward, several Costa Palmas buyers sued Irongate and Desarrolladora La Ribera in United States courts. GS 1975 LLC filed in Los Angeles County Superior Court (case 23STCV06016), and TRG CP LLC in the United States District Court for the Central District of California (case 2:23-cv-00341). Both suits alleged cost overruns, delivery delays, and breach of contract, among other claims.

In January 2024, Desarrolladora La Ribera filed a counterclaim for defamation and tortious interference with prospective business relations in the United States District Court for the Southern District of New York (case 24-CV-67), against the plaintiffs and public relations firm 5W Public Relations. In December 2024, the court sent part of the dispute to arbitration before the International Chamber of Commerce in Mexico.

As of early 2026, the litigation remains ongoing and no court has determined liability.

=== Environmental impact ===
In May 2024, Hakai Magazine ran an investigation by Krista Langlois on the development's environmental footprint. The piece documented damage to wetlands and mangrove habitats in the area and described a 5.7-kilometer stone wall along the Santiago arroyo, built to channel floodwaters away from the golf course and resort structures. The report said this diversion reduces recharge of the aquifer supplying the neighboring town of La Ribera, and that local residents reported water shortages after the resort began operating.

The same piece found that the golf course uses the daily water equivalent of roughly 9,000 people, and that the East Cape population doubled between 2010 and 2020. The Sierra Club has raised similar concerns about the development's impact on the Baja California Peninsula coastline.

=== Irongate's response ===
In a 2019 Financial Times interview, Irongate chief executive Jason Grosfeld said he wanted Costa Palmas to be "the most environmentally friendly tourism development in North America", adding that the project would have fewer rooms than originally approved.

== Recognition ==
The Four Seasons Los Cabos at Costa Palmas made the Condé Nast Traveler Hot List in 2020.
