= Capital Group =

Capital Group or Kapital Grupp may refer to:

- Beijing Capital Group (北京首都创业集团有限公司), a Chinese state-owned enterprise
- Capital Group Companies (The Capital Group Companies, Inc.), an American investment management company
- Capital Group (Australia) (Capital Group), an Australian transport and logistics company
- Capital Group (Tbilisi) (კაპიტალ ჯგუფი), a construction company based in Tbilisi, Georgia
- Capital Group (Russia) (Capital Group), a real estate development group based in Moscow, Russia
- Capital Group (Samara) (Капитал Групп), a construction and property development company based in Samara, Russia
- Kapital Grupp (Novosibirsk) (Капитал Групп), a construction company based in Novosibirsk, Russia
- Kapital Grupp (Krasnodar) (Капитал Групп), an automotive lubricants supplier based in Krasnodar, Russia

== See also ==
- Capital Group Service (Capital group SERVICE s.r.o.), a Czech holding company
- CDIB Capital Group (中華開發資本股份有限公司), a Taiwanese investment company and subsidiary of KGI Financial Holding
- Grand Capital Group (Grand Capital Group), a property developer based in Tashkent, Uzbekistan
- KK Kapital Grupp (Консалтинговая компания «КАПИТАЛ Групп»), a valuation and consulting company based in Moscow, Russia
- SK Kapital Grupp (СК Капитал Групп), a Russian construction company
- Artemis Capital Group, a public finance firm formerly headed by Robin Wiessmann
- Fog Cutter Capital Group Inc., an investment company founded by Andrew Wiederhorn
- Guardian Capital Group (Guardian Capital Group Limited), a Canadian financial services company
- ICG plc, a British investment company formerly known as Intermediate Capital Group plc
- Storyboard Capital Group, a production company for Freaks
