= Skuratov =

Skuratov (Russian: Скуратов) is a Russian masculine surname, its feminine counterpart is Skuratova.

It may refer to:

- Aleksey Skuratov (1709-after 1765), Russian Arctic navigator
- Malyuta Skuratov (died 1573), Russian noble and opposition leader;
- Maria Skuratova-Belskaya (died 1605), Russian Tsaritsa, daughter of Malyuta, spouse of Tsar Boris Godunov
- Sergey Skuratov
- Vadym Skuratov
- Yury Skuratov (born 1952), Russian lawyer and politician.

== See also ==
- CGS Minto, Canadian icebreaker renamed to Skuratov
