= BCG =

BCG may refer to:

== Astronomy ==
- Blue compact galaxy, a type of galaxy undergoing an exceptionally high rate of star formation
- Brightest cluster galaxy, the brightest in a cluster of galaxies

== Medicine and biochemistry ==
- BCG vaccine (Bacillus Calmette–Guérin), for tuberculosis
- Ballistocardiography, measuring heart forces
- Bromocresol green, a dye and pH indicator

== Companies ==
- Beijing Capital Group, a Chinese state-owned real estate company
- Boston Consulting Group, a global management consulting firm
- Buffalo Creek and Gauley Railroad (BC&G, 1904-1965), from Dundon to Widen in Clay County, West Virginia, US

== Other uses ==
- BCG matrix, for product line analysis
- Billy Gillispie, American basketball coach
- Bolt, carrier group in a firearm
- British Comedy Guide
- Big City Greens, a Disney animated series
- "Birth control glasses", common dysphemism for GI glasses
