= Vanessa Grout =

American real estate entrepreneur, investor and journalist

Vanessa Grout is an American real estate entrepreneur, investor and journalist. She was CEO of South Florida real estate brokerage Douglas Elliman during which time she restructured and expanded the company throughout South Florida. She is currently CEO of OKO Real Estate, an affiliate of International property development company OKO Group, founded by Vladislav Doronin developer and CEO of Aman Resorts, and recently acquired a 6.7-acre site in downtown Fort Lauderdale. She is also the Head of Global Residences & Club for Aman Resorts. Grout is a licensed attorney and real estate broker and a regular contributor to Forbes on the topics of real estate and business.

== Early life and education ==
Vanessa Grout was born in Miami, Florida, the daughter of Melanie and John Frederick Grout, Jr. She attended The Benjamin School, an independent college preparatory school in North Palm Beach, Florida. She earned her bachelor's degree from the University of Miami, a Juris Doctor degree from St. Thomas University School of Law and an MBA in finance from NYU Stern School of Business. While a law student in Miami, she clerked for attorney Roy Black, who defended William Kennedy Smith.

== Douglas Elliman ==
Vanessa Grout was appointed CEO of Douglas Elliman Florida by Howard Lorber, chairman of Douglas Elliman Realty and CEO of Vector Group Ltd. (NYSE: VGR) in 2010. Through its real estate arm, New Valley LLC, Vector Group owns Douglas Elliman Realty, the largest residential brokerage company in New York.

== Philanthropy ==
Vanessa Grout is a member of the Young Presidents' Organization (YPO), a founder of the Mount Sinai Medical Center in Miami Beach, and a member of the board of trustees for the Miami Science Museum. Vanessa Grout is on the advisory board of the University of Miami School of Architecture and the Leadership Advisory Board of FIU College of Architecture and The Arts.
