= Crown Building (Manhattan) =

Building in Manhattan, New York

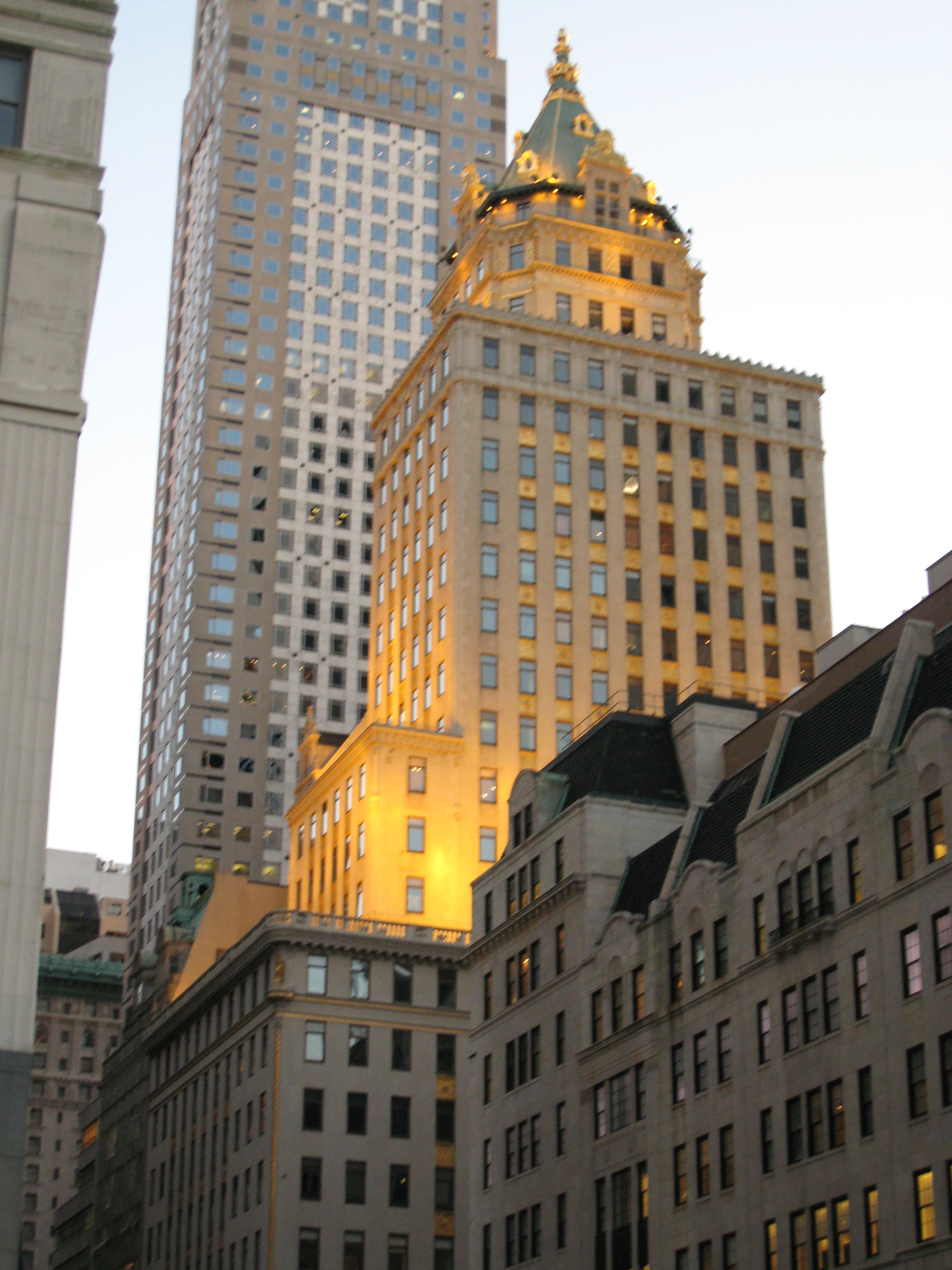
- View of the Crown Building in 2007
- Former names: Heckscher Building, Genesco Building
- Alternative names: 730 Fifth Avenue
- Hotel chain: Aman

General information
- Architectural style: French Renaissance
- Location: 730 Fifth Avenue, New York City, United States
- Coordinates: 40°45′46″N 73°58′28″W
- Construction started: 1920
- Completed: 1921
- Renovated: 2019–2022
- Renovation cost: $1.45 billion
- Landlord: Vladislav Doronin (hotel), General Growth Properties and Brookfield Properties (retail)

Height
- Height: 416 ft (127 m)

Technical details
- Floor count: 25
- Grounds: 26,360 ft^{2} (2,449 m^{2})

Design and construction
- Architect: Charles D. Wetmore
- Architecture firm: Warren and Wetmore
- Developer: August Heckscher

Other information
- Number of units: 83 hotel suites, 22 apartments

New York City Landmark
- Designated: May 14, 2024
- Reference no.: 2678

The Crown Building (formerly the Heckscher Building and Genesco Building) is a 25-story, 416-foot-tall (127 m) building at 730 Fifth Avenue, on the southwest corner of Fifth Avenue and 57th Street, in the Midtown Manhattan neighborhood of New York City. Constructed between 1920 and 1922 for the philanthropist August Heckscher, the structure was designed by Warren and Wetmore as an office building. The lower levels contain retail space, while the upper levels became the luxury Aman New York hotel and residences in 2022. The structure has been a New York City designated landmark since 2024.

The building's stepped setback design was regulated by the 1916 Zoning Resolution. Its exterior includes French Renaissance details and is divided into a nine-story base, a twelve-story shaft, and a four-story octagonal pyramidal roof. The facade is largely made of limestone, with brick and terracotta detailing, along with 1,363 ounces (38,600 g) of gold leaf. The lower stories include retail stores, while the upper stories originally contained offices before they were redesigned by Jean-Michel Gathy in the 2020s. The upper stories are split up into 22 condominium residences, 83 hotel rooms, and amenity spaces such as a spa and three restaurants. Over the years, the building has received commentary for its general shape and for the design of its roof.

August Heckscher acquired land for the building from 1913 to 1918. After the Heckscher Building was completed, it housed several businesses and art galleries, and it was also the first home of the Museum of Modern Art. Heckscher lost the building to foreclosure in 1938. Charles F. Noyes and Joseph Durst bought the building in 1946 before reselling it four years later. It was renamed the Genesco Building in 1964 and sold again in 1966. The structure was purchased in 1981 by Philippine dictator Ferdinand E. Marcos, and the name was changed to the Crown Building in 1983, after its crown-like look when illuminated at night. The Crown Building was the focus of various lawsuits after the fall of the Marcos regime, and in 1991, Bernard Spitzer and partners Marvin Winter and Jerome L. Greene acquired the building. In 2015, Michael Shvo and Russian billionaire Vladislav Doronin purchased the office portion of the building. OKO Group took over the upper stories, which were converted to hotel and residential use from 2019 to 2022.

== Site ==
The Crown Building is at 730 Fifth Avenue, at the southwest corner of Fifth Avenue and 57th Street, in the Midtown Manhattan neighborhood of New York City. The land lot is composed of a rectangular site at Fifth Avenue and 57th Street, as well as a connected site at 56th Street. The lot covers 26,360 square feet (2,449 m^{2}), with a frontage of 100 feet (30 m) on Fifth Avenue and a depth of 162.5 feet (49.5 m) along 57th Street. On the same block is the townhouse at 17 West 56th Street. The 712 Fifth Avenue skyscraper and the townhouses at 10 and 12 West 56th Street are one block south, 745 Fifth Avenue is directly to the northeast, and the Bergdorf Goodman Building and Solow Building are immediately across 57th Street to the north. Other nearby buildings include 3 East 57th Street to the northwest; the Tiffany & Co. flagship store, Trump Tower, and 590 Madison Avenue to the east; and the Corning Glass Building to the southeast.

Fifth Avenue between 42nd Street and Central Park South (59th Street) was relatively undeveloped through the late 19th century. The surrounding area was once part of the common lands of the city of New York. The Commissioners' Plan of 1811 established Manhattan's street grid with lots measuring 100 feet (30 m) deep and 25 feet (7.6 m) wide. Upscale residences were constructed around Fifth Avenue following the American Civil War. These included two residences on Fifth Avenue and 57th Street: a mansion belonging to Frederic W. Stevens at the southwest corner, and the Cornelius Vanderbilt II House on the northwest corner. By the 1900s, that section of Fifth Avenue was becoming a commercial area, and stores were also developed on 57th Street in the 1910s. After about 1921, art galleries started to supplant residences on 57th Street, and other art galleries developed on the street in general.

The Crown Building is also near a former artistic hub around a two-block section of West 57th Street between Sixth Avenue and Broadway. The hub had been developed during the late 19th and early 20th centuries, after the opening of Carnegie Hall on Seventh Avenue in 1891. The area contained several headquarters of organizations such as the American Fine Arts Society, the Lotos Club, and the ASCE Society House. The Crown Building also had art-related tenants such as the Museum of Modern Art in the early 20th century. By the 21st century, the arts hub had largely been replaced with Billionaires' Row, a series of luxury skyscrapers around the southern end of Central Park.

=== Previous buildings ===
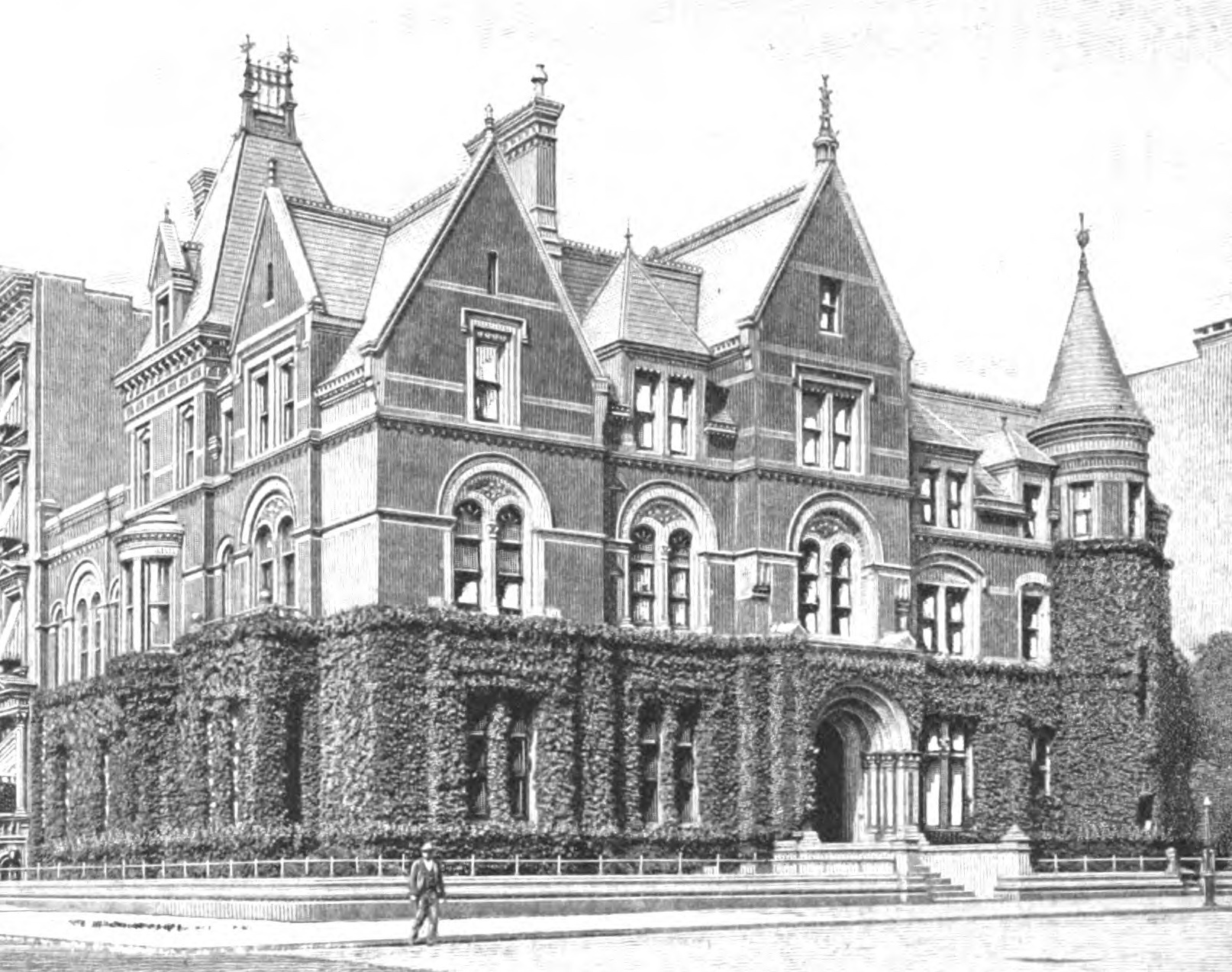
The Frederic W. Stevens House, which stood on the site before the Crown Building was built

Before the Crown Building's construction, the site at 728 Fifth Avenue was occupied by a marble townhouse belonging to the businessman Charles W. Morse. The Morse family owned the house until it was sold at a foreclosure auction in 1910, then acquired by the businessman Harry Payne Whitney in May 1911.

Next door at 2 West 57th Street was a mansion built from 1875 to 1876 for the lawyer and banker Frederic W. Stevens. The Stevens house, designed by George E. Harney, was smaller in scale compared to similar mansions along the avenue. The Stevens house's interior was undistinguished, except for a ballroom imported from Belgium; it also was acquired by the Whitney family by the 1910s.

== Architecture ==
The Crown Building was designed by Charles D. Wetmore of Warren and Wetmore and completed in 1921 as the Heckscher Building. Wetmore had invested in the tower's construction along with the mining magnate August Heckscher. The structure includes details in the French Renaissance style, which had been selected because it was similar to the style used by the Cornelius Vanderbilt II Mansion nearby. Châteauesque decorations like salamanders were incorporated into the design. The Crown Building was one of the city's last skyscrapers to be completed before Art Deco architecture in New York City gained popularity. George Backer Inc. was the building's main contractor. Several other firms, including terracotta contractor New York Architectural Terra-Cotta and marble contractor A. R. Zicha Marble Co., provided construction materials and mechanical systems.

=== Form and facade ===
The structure is 25 stories high, with a nine-story base, a twelve-story shaft, and four-story octagonal pyramidal roof. The building was divided into stores and showrooms on the lower levels and offices on the upper floors. In addition to the main structure on 57th Street and Fifth Avenue, there was a six-story annex facing 56th Street, which originally had its own entrance. The annex measured 100 by 100 feet (30 by 30 m) across, stood six stories high, and contained accommodations for employees who worked in the main structure. In 2021, the annex on 56th Street was replaced with a glass structure.

The Crown Building's massing, or shape, was regulated by the 1916 Zoning Resolution. There are three primary setbacks, at the 10th, 13th, and 21st stories. The building is set back a different distance from each of the surrounding streets, and different setbacks were required for each elevation, since 56th Street is narrower than either 57th Street or Fifth Avenue. The shaft is located toward the southern end of the site, near the center of the block, and the setbacks on each side are complex and asymmetrical. In addition, when the Heckscher Building was completed, it could be seen from several miles north, across the nearby Central Park. After the building was converted into a hotel and residential building in the 2020s, outdoor terraces and swimming pools were added to the setbacks. Some of the setbacks also have glass railings.

The facade is made of limestone, buff-colored brick, and cream-colored architectural terracotta. The facade is decorated with 1,363 ounces (38,600 g) of 23-karat gold leaf, which was added in the 1980s. According to a promotional brochure from the time, was the largest such application of gold leaf in a commercial building in the U.S. Terracotta reliefs drew attention to each of the main setbacks, while copper spandrel panels with reliefs were used to unite the windows on different stories. When the building opened, the spandrel panels were coated in acid to turn them bright green. The Council on Tall Buildings and Urban Habitat lists the building as being 416 feet (127 m) tall. Originally, the building measured 410 feet (120 m) tall from the ground to the tip of its weather vane.

==== Base ====
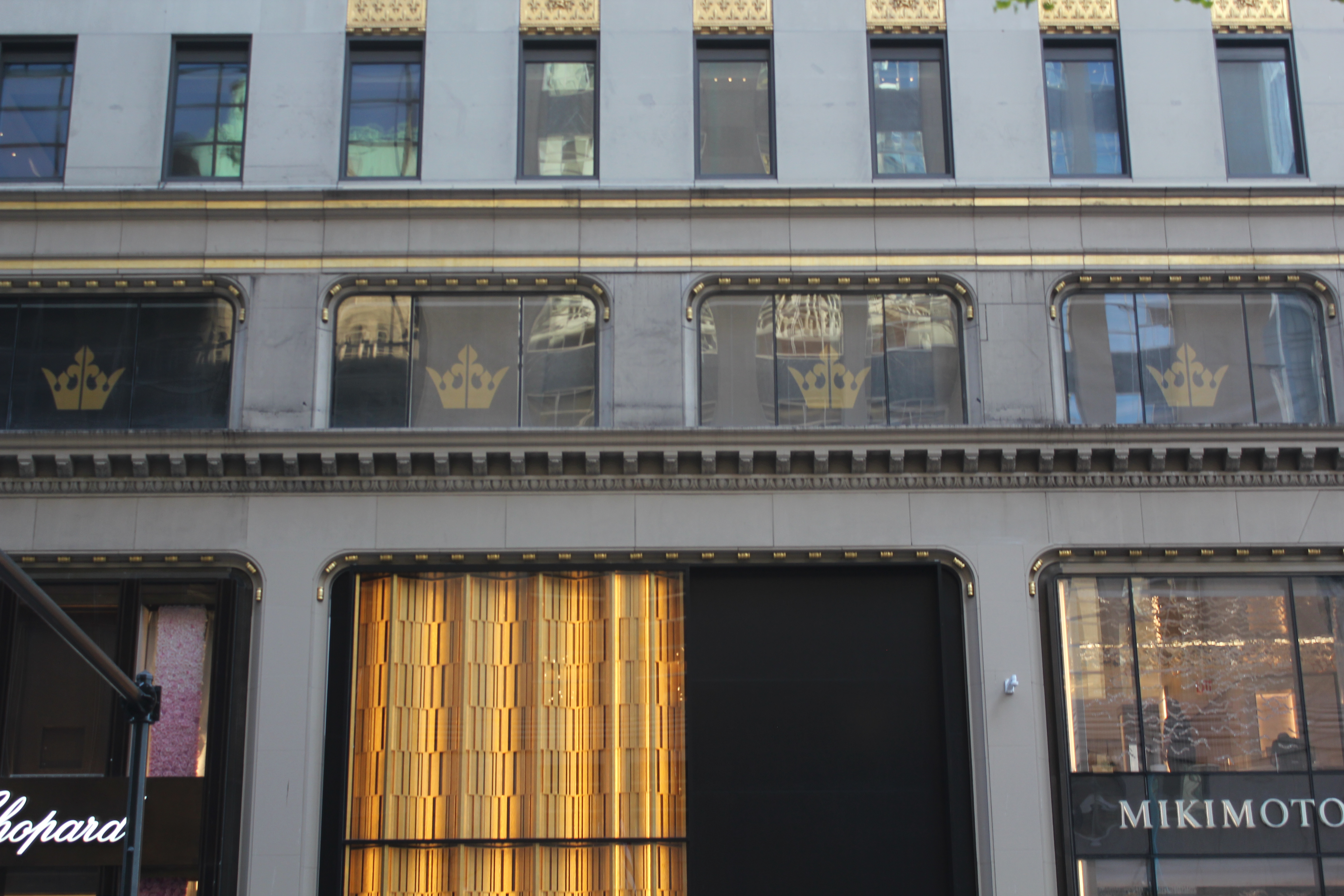
The 2nd through 4th stories. The windows on the 3rd story each span multiple bays, and there are cornices above the 2nd and 3rd stories.

The lowest nine stories are clad with Indiana limestone. There are cornices above the 2nd, 3rd, and 8th stories, dividing the building's base horizontally into four segments. At ground level, the northern facade along 57th Street measures 162 feet (49 m) across and is divided vertically into 18 bays. The eastern facade on Fifth Avenue is 100 feet (30 m) across and is divided into 11 bays. The lowest two stories contain double-height storefronts divided by limestone pilasters and topped by flat arches with small brackets and rounded corners. The storefronts were originally one story high, but their heights were increased at some point after 1983. One of the storefronts (the Bulgari store at the corner of 57th Street and Fifth Avenue) has a mesh facade whose design is patterned after a 1930s bracelet clasp. The original main entrance was at the far left (south) end of the Fifth Avenue elevation; it contained four doors, flanked by columns and pilasters.

Above the 2nd story, the northeast corner (facing 57th Street and Fifth Avenue) has a column with a spiraling pattern, which supports a pedestal with brackets atop the 8th story. For the most part, the windows on the 3rd through 9th stories are rectangular windows set within the limestone facade. After 1983, the third-story windows were widened to encompass several bays each. At the center of the Fifth Avenue and 57th Street elevations of the facade, some of the windows have gilded spandrel panels with faces, leaves, and fleurs-de-lis. The cornice above the 9th floor is topped by a balustrade made of stone or terracotta, which in turn is decorated with salamander motifs. At the 9th story, there is a statue of a woman at the northeast corner.

==== Shaft ====
Above the 9th story, the building is clad with brick and has terracotta trim. The shaft is clad with custom bricks measuring 4 by 4 by 11.5 inches (100 mm × 100 mm × 290 mm). The 10th through 21st stories comprise the shaft, which is set back from the base. The shaft is clad with buff brick, except for curved masonry quoins at each corner. The facade's eastern elevation faces Fifth Avenue. The main portion of the eastern elevation is six bays wide and has a setback above the 13th story; there are two additional bays to the south, which rise to a masonry pediment above the 15th story. The northern elevation is thirteen bays wide on the 10th through 13th stories; due to the setback on Fifth Avenue, this facade is ten bays wide on the 14th through 21st stories. The inner bays on the eastern and northern elevations have gilded spandrel panels similar to those in the base, while the outermost bay on either end has plain spandrels. Additionally, the 21st story has terracotta window frames.

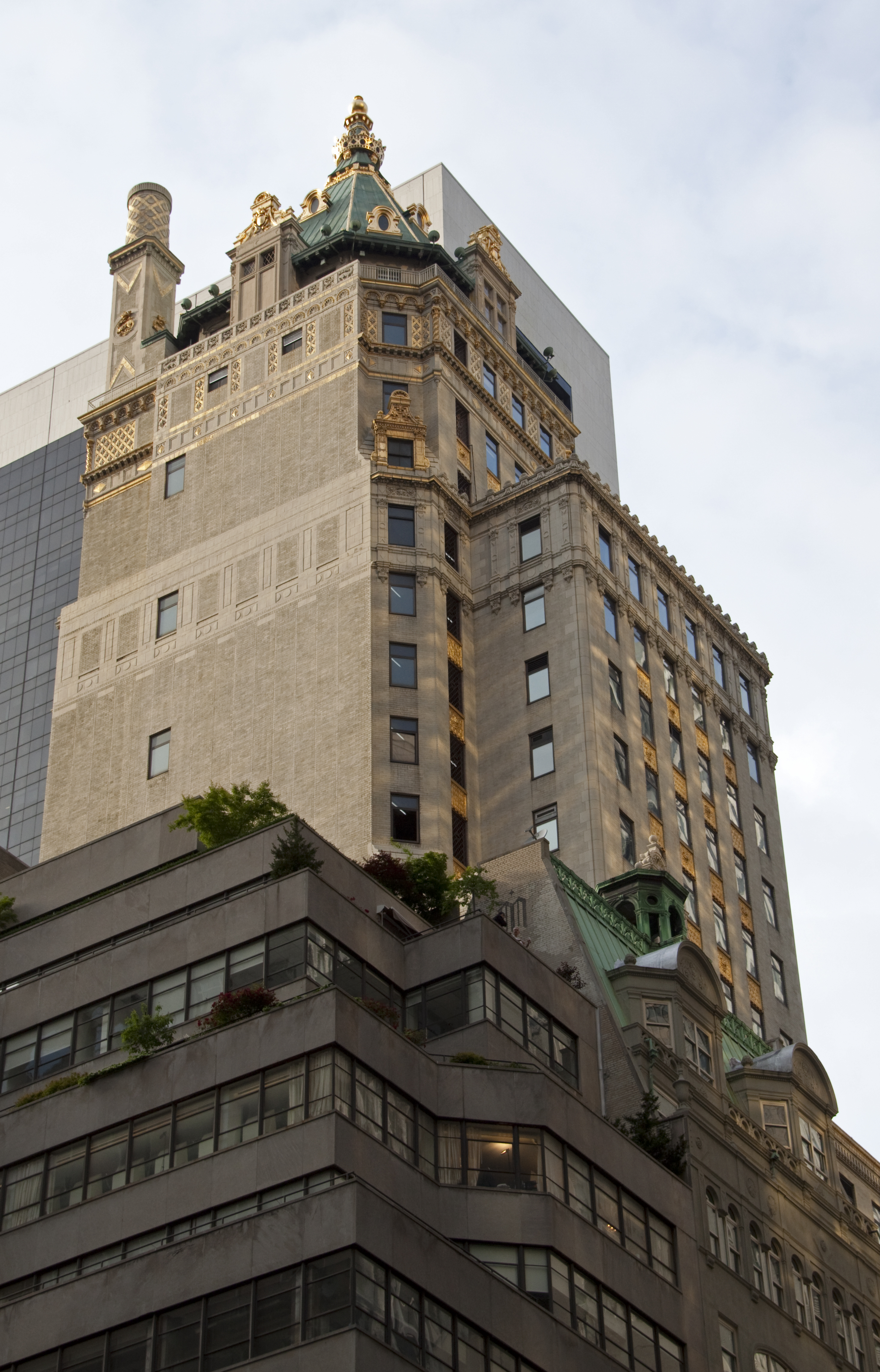
The Crown Building's shaft viewed from the southeast. At left is the largely windowless south facade; at right is the east facade.

The southern and western elevations are partly obscured by other structures. The southern elevation has no windows, except on the 21st story and its western portion. This is because, at the time of the Heckscher Building's construction, the architects had anticipated that another building might be built directly to the south; for the same reason, the building's elevator banks are all clustered along the southern facade. The western elevation has cornices, spandrel panels, terracotta frames, and some ventilation grilles.

==== Roof ====
The gilded spandrel panels above the 22nd story resemble the spandrel panels used in the base and shaft. On the 24th story, each bay is separated vertically by panels with rhombus motifs, and there are colonettes with spiral motifs at each corner. The 24th-story windows are topped by a horizontal row of corbels. Above the southwest corner of the 24th story is a chimney with rhombus, chevron, and salamander motifs. The 25th story is set back and contains several ornate dormer windows with pilasters, shell motifs, cartouches, and pediments.

Above the 25th story rises an octagonal, pyramidal roof, which is painted green and is pierced by two stories of windows. The top of the pyramid includes ball, ring, and garland motifs. There was originally a "golden cock" atop the roof, which was part of a weather vane. The figure weighed 450 pounds (200 kg) and measured 10 by 8.5 feet (3.0 by 2.6 m). Immediately below the rooster, there was also a small observation deck with replicas of jewels. The weather vane was removed during World War II.

=== Features ===
The building originally had 35,000 square feet (3,300 m^{2}) of retail space, as well as 400,000 square feet (37,000 m^{2}) of office space. The lowest nine stories were originally used as showrooms and stores, and the upper stories had offices. There were 10 passenger elevators from the ground floor to the upper stories. By the 2020s, the lowest three stories were used as retail space, while the 4th floor and above were used as a hotel and residences.

==== Base ====
Originally, the building's base contained numerous art galleries and showrooms. In the basement were a shipping room and freight-handling facilities. At ground level was a T-shaped shopping arcade. One leg of the arcade was flanked by small shops and ran from 57th to 56th Street, while another leg ran east to Fifth Avenue. The entrance vestibule from Fifth Avenue had bluestone floors, carved limestone walls, and a pair of stained-glass windows. The arcades and elevator lobbies had black-and-gold marble walls with brass trim, while the floors were made of black Belgian marble tile with brass inserts. Eight of the building's passenger elevators were in the Fifth Avenue leg of the arcade, while the other two elevators were located in the annex, with a separate elevator vestibule. There were also display cases facing the elevators, in addition to a telephone stand.

==== Residences and hotel ====
Following the building's conversion to the Aman New York hotel in 2022, the building has contained 22 residential condominium apartments, in addition to 83 hotel suites. The hotel and residences have separate entrances. Glass soundproofing is used throughout both the hotel and residences. The Aman New York's spaces are generally decorated in what one magazine described as "minimalist colors", although there are also gold-plated decorations, an allusion to the gold leaf on the facade.

The hotel suites were designed by Jean-Michel Gathy. Each of the hotel rooms covers between 340 and 2,770 square feet (32 and 257 m^{2}); (Note: Other sources cite a minimum area of 718 square feet (66.7 m^{2}) or 745 square feet (69.2 m^{2}). The four smallest suites are 340-square-foot studios that are attached to larger units; excluding these studios, the smallest room is 745 square feet.) at the time of the building's conversion, even the smallest rooms were twice the average size of a studio apartment in Midtown. Various woods are used for doors, floors, and other furniture, and steel, brass, and bronze are also used. The rooms have contemporary furniture, which is interspersed with the original Beaux-Arts interior decorations. The hotel units have Japanese-inspired decorations, including patterned stone floors, movable doors with rice paper panels, and large murals inspired by the 16th-century painting Shōrin-zu byōbu. The rooms have ceilings measuring 11 feet (3.4 m) high, and all the rooms also have gas fireplaces and retractable TVs. Each suite has a bathroom with a large tub and shower. One of the larger suites is the Corner Suite, which covers 2,025 square feet (188.1 m^{2}). The largest suites are the Aman suites on floors 11 and 12, which each have a kitchenette, a bar, and hidden compartments.

The residential condos are on floors 15 through 26. (Note: Also described as floors 15 through 30. The floor numbers do not correspond to the physical stories in the building.) They have a combined area of 95,000 square feet (8,800 m^{2}), giving each residence an average area of 4,300 square feet (400 m^{2}). The largest residence in the building is a five-story penthouse that covers 14,000 square feet (1,300 m^{2}); it has a full-floor master suite as well as a piano lounge, a gallery, two pools, two kitchens, four other bedrooms, and a game room. The five-bedroom, 6,300-square-foot (590 m^{2}) Vana penthouse on floor 21 has a library and private theater. Another large unit is the four-bedroom, 6,700-square-foot (620 m^{2}) Jala penthouse on floor 20, which has 3,750 square feet (348 m^{2}) of outdoor terraces in addition to a pool. The other residences have varying numbers of bedrooms. The residential units are accessed from their own elevator, which also stops at the restaurant and spa levels.

==== Amenity spaces ====
The hotel portion of the building has a spa and three restaurants. The spa covers 22,000 square feet (2,000 m^{2}) or 25,000 square feet (2,300 m^{2}), and it spans across three stories. The spa includes two "spa houses", as well as fire pits around an indoor swimming pool that measures 65 feet (20 m) long. The two "spa houses" have various treatment rooms, pools, beds, and fireplaces, which can be rented out. The swimming pool is hidden behind an unmarked wooden door. There is a jazz club in the basement, the Aman Jazz Club, which is accessed through an annex on 56th Street. The hotel also has two restaurants: Nama, which serves Japanese cuisine, and Arva, which serves Mediterranean cuisine.

Floor 14 has an atrium with sculptures designed by Peter Gentenaar. On the tenth story is the Garden Terrace, which occupies multiple exterior spaces and includes a dining room, cigar bar, and drinking bar. The Garden Terrace covers 7,000 square feet (650 m^{2}) and is covered by a retractable glass canopy. Other amenity spaces in the hotel include a sky lobby, wine library, and piano bar. In addition, the hotel has a private club called Aman Club. The club is limited to 600 members whose identities are not publicized. Members are allowed to use the hotel's amenities, receive discounted food at the restaurants, and have a private concierge.

== History ==
=== Heckscher ownership ===
What is now the Crown Building was developed by August Heckscher, who had built his fortune from mining and Manhattan real estate. Heckscher actively mined commodities such as copper, coal, and zinc in the northeastern U.S. during the late 19th and early 20th centuries. He began buying buildings in Manhattan in 1910, and he was also a philanthropist who supported museums such as the Heckscher Museum of Art and El Museo del Barrio. The Real Estate Record and Guide wrote in 1912 that Heckscher "has not invested largely in real estate hitherto as an individual" but owned at least two other Fifth Avenue properties. Before Heckscher developed what is now the Crown Building, he had built another Heckscher Building at the intersection of Madison Avenue and 42nd Street; that building also had setbacks in its design, even though it predated the 1916 Zoning Resolution.

==== Site acquisition ====
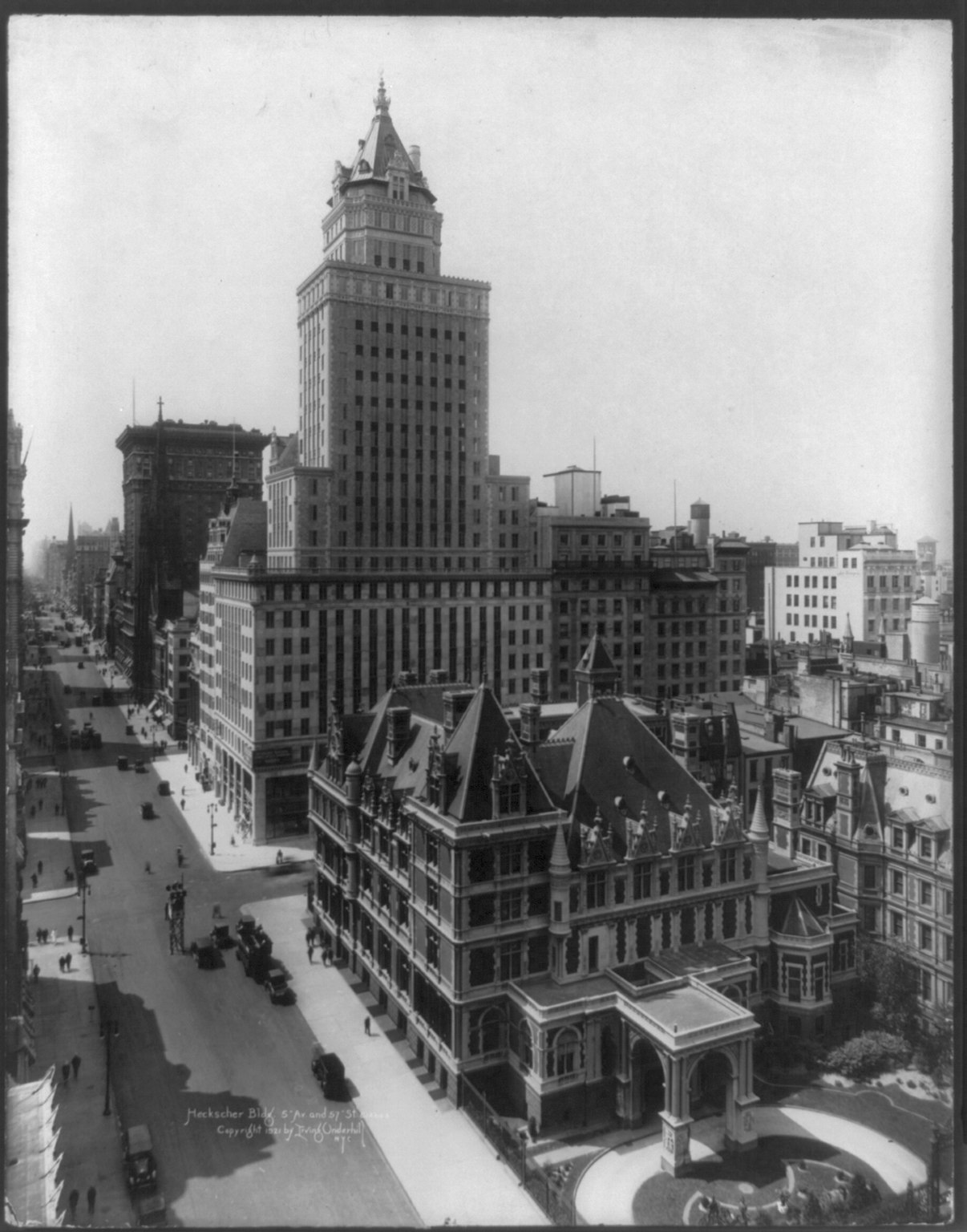
Heckscher Building, 1921

In December 1912, the 734 Fifth Avenue Company bought the Morse and Stevens–Whitney houses and immediately began tearing down the houses to make way for a commercial building. Heckscher told his broker not to publicize the fact that he was buying the structure, but the Real Estate Record and Guide reported that Heckscher was involved with the 734 Fifth Avenue Company. The New-York Tribune wrote that Heckscher was "highly incensed" that his secret purchase had been announced publicly because he had wanted to give the Whitney mansion to his wife as a surprise gift. Heckscher was recorded as the property's owner by January 1913. That July, Heckscher hired H. Edwards Ficken to build a three-story commercial building on the site. The structure included stores on the ground story, offices on the second, and galleries on the third.

Heckscher bought James Roosevelt's residence at 3 West 57th Street and two other houses at 3–5 West 56th Street in late 1913. In November 1915, Heckscher acquired the adjacent properties at 7 West 56th Street and 6–8 West 57th Street from the estate of J. S. Kennedy. The site was quickly resold to Michael Dreicer, who built a structure on the 57th Street lots. Heckscher bought back 7 and 9 West 56th Street from Dreicer in February 1918. Heckscher formed a holding company called Anahma Realty, which was named after his yacht, though work was delayed likely due to the Spanish flu.

==== Development ====
George Backer leased the corner of 57th Street and Fifth Avenue for 21 years, along with the adjacent Kennedy property on 56th Street, from Heckscher in 1919. The L-shaped site wrapped around Joseph Duveen's art dealership on 56th Street. Backer then announced plans for a 30-story building on the site, which would have cost $6 million and would have included offices, apartments, a theater, and some stores. Warren and Wetmore were hired as the architects. As planned, there would have been only one setback; the base would have risen 125 feet (38 m) above ground, while the shaft would have ascended another 325 feet (99 m). The lower stories would have contained eight stories of showrooms and commercial stores, and the apartments and offices would have been located above. There would also have been an enclosed shopping arcade leading from both 57th Street and Fifth Avenue. The arcade would have led to a 900-seat, ten-story theater on 56th Street.

Hughes & Hammond placed a $4.5 million mortgage loan on the building's site in February 1920, which at the time was one of the largest real-estate loans ever placed on a property in New York City. The Heckscher Building was to be the first tall building along the Midtown segment of Fifth Avenue, and its theater would have been the first Broadway theater along this same segment. Insurance companies objected to the original plans, and the New York City Department of Buildings refused to approve the theater. That August, Wetmore reduced the building's overall height to 25 stories, and the apartments and theater were removed from the plans. The building was to be used purely as a commercial and office structure, without any manufacturing. The three-story structure on the site had been demolished by October 1920. By then, the first 13 stories were planned to be used as shops (with showrooms on floors 2 through 9), while the 14th through 25th stories were to be used as offices.

At the time of the building's development, Heckscher believed that the building was "the ultimate location for the exclusive shopping center of New York" because businesses would not relocate north of 59th Street in great numbers. Backer's construction company built the Heckscher Building, while Heckscher had a one-third ownership stake in the building. After Backer's death in May 1921, the executor of his estate, Samuel Levy, completed the structure. By mid-1921, the Heckscher Building's rental agents Cushman & Wakefield were looking to attract retail tenants to the building. Although media from August 1921 advertised the building as being ready for occupancy by the beginning of September, the building was still reportedly not complete in January 1922. The structure was finished in 1922.

==== Early years ====
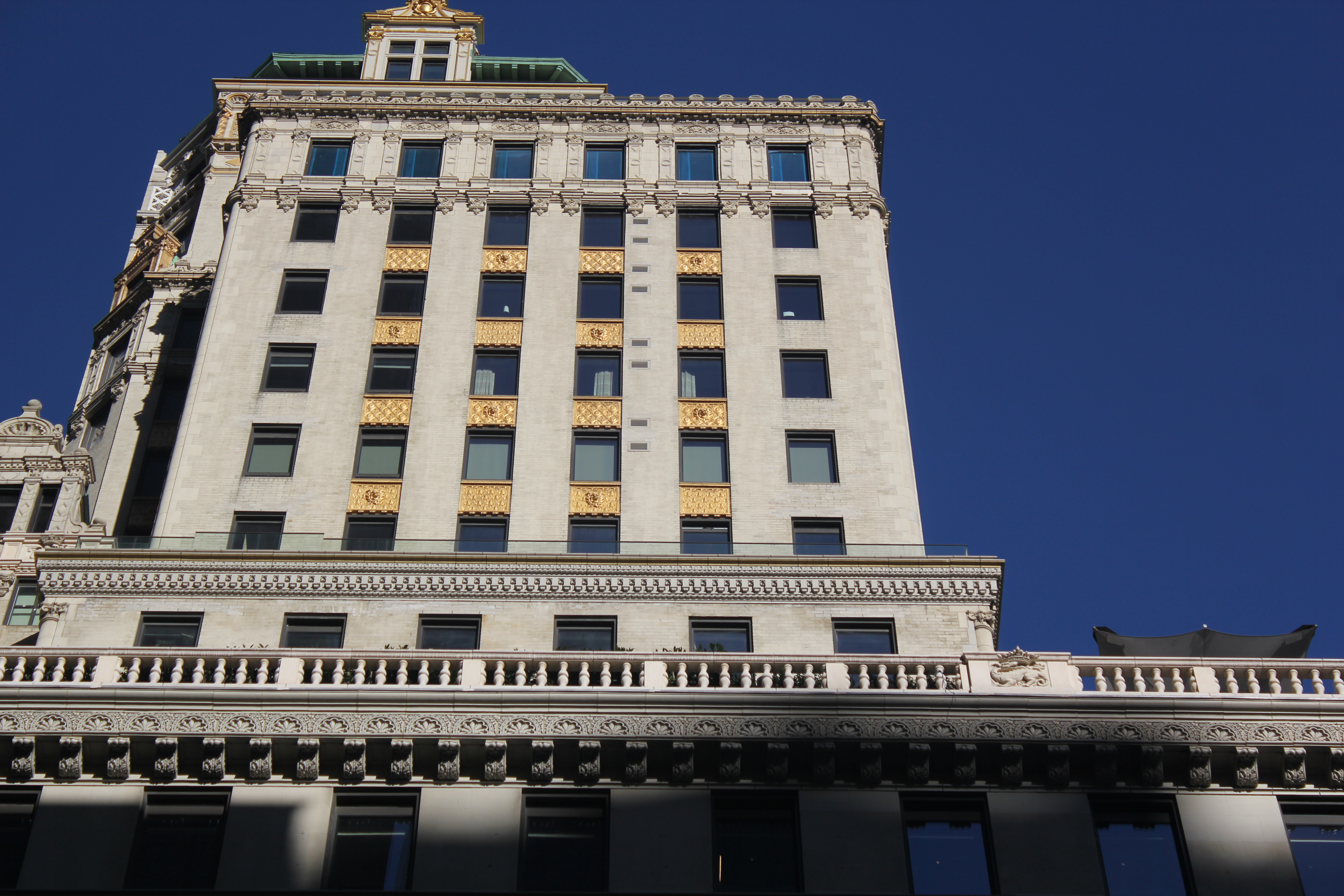
The Crown Building's shaft seen from Fifth Avenue

The building's base originally contained numerous art galleries and showrooms. Linen store Mosse Inc. was the first retail tenant, signing a lease in January 1922. Tenants with full floors in the building included upholstery and decoration distributor Stroheim & Romann, the Consolidated Cigar Company, stockbroker J. P. Benkard & Co., and oil refiner Cosden & Co. Women's Wear wrote that the building's completion coincided with the increasing concentration of businesses along 57th Street, while the New York Herald Tribune wrote that its construction accelerated its commercial redevelopment. In any case, the building was nearly fully occupied in October 1923, and fashion store Joseph's leased the building's last available storefront in October 1924. Other early tenants with large amounts of space included jewelers Udall & Ballou and the Hadley-Leon apparel store. Harry Payne Whitney offered $7 million to buy the building in 1926, though Heckscher declined. Instead, Heckscher refinanced the building in 1930 with a $4.5 million mortgage loan, replacing the previous mortgages.

The Museum of Modern Art moved into a six-room gallery on the Heckscher Building's twelfth floor in November 1929; it was MoMA's first-ever location. Among the notable exhibitions that MoMA hosted at the building was the Modern Architecture: International Exhibition, in which curators Henry-Russell Hitchcock and Philip Johnson popularized the term International Style. MoMA also displayed work from other artists, such as Vincent van Gogh, Paul Cézanne, Georges Seurat, and Paul Gauguin, at the Heckscher Building. In the same building, the Mexican artist Diego Rivera had rented a studio where, in 1931, he created works for a MoMA exhibition. MoMA remained at the Heckscher Building until 1932, when it moved to 53rd Street. During the 1930s, other tenants with large amounts of space included womenswear company Nelson-Hickson Inc., linen retailers William Coulson & Sons, antiques dealer Symons Inc., film studio Universal Pictures, and camera maker E. Leitz Inc. There was also a four-room exhibition studio for Studio Guild Galleries, in addition to a contract bridge club and a luncheon club.

With the construction of Rockefeller Center nearby in the 1930s, Heckscher blamed Rockefeller Center's developers for decreased demand at his building. Heckscher sued Rockefeller Center's developers for $10 million in January 1934, claiming that the developers took over the tenants' old leases at below market rate or paid tenants to disregard or cancel the leases at their old buildings. No trial was ever held for the lawsuit, and in December 1934, the City Bank-Farmers Trust Company filed to foreclose on the building's mortgage. The Heckscher Building was offered for sale at a foreclosure auction in early July 1938, and City Bank Farmers Trust paid $4.25 million for the structure that month.

=== Mid-20th century ===
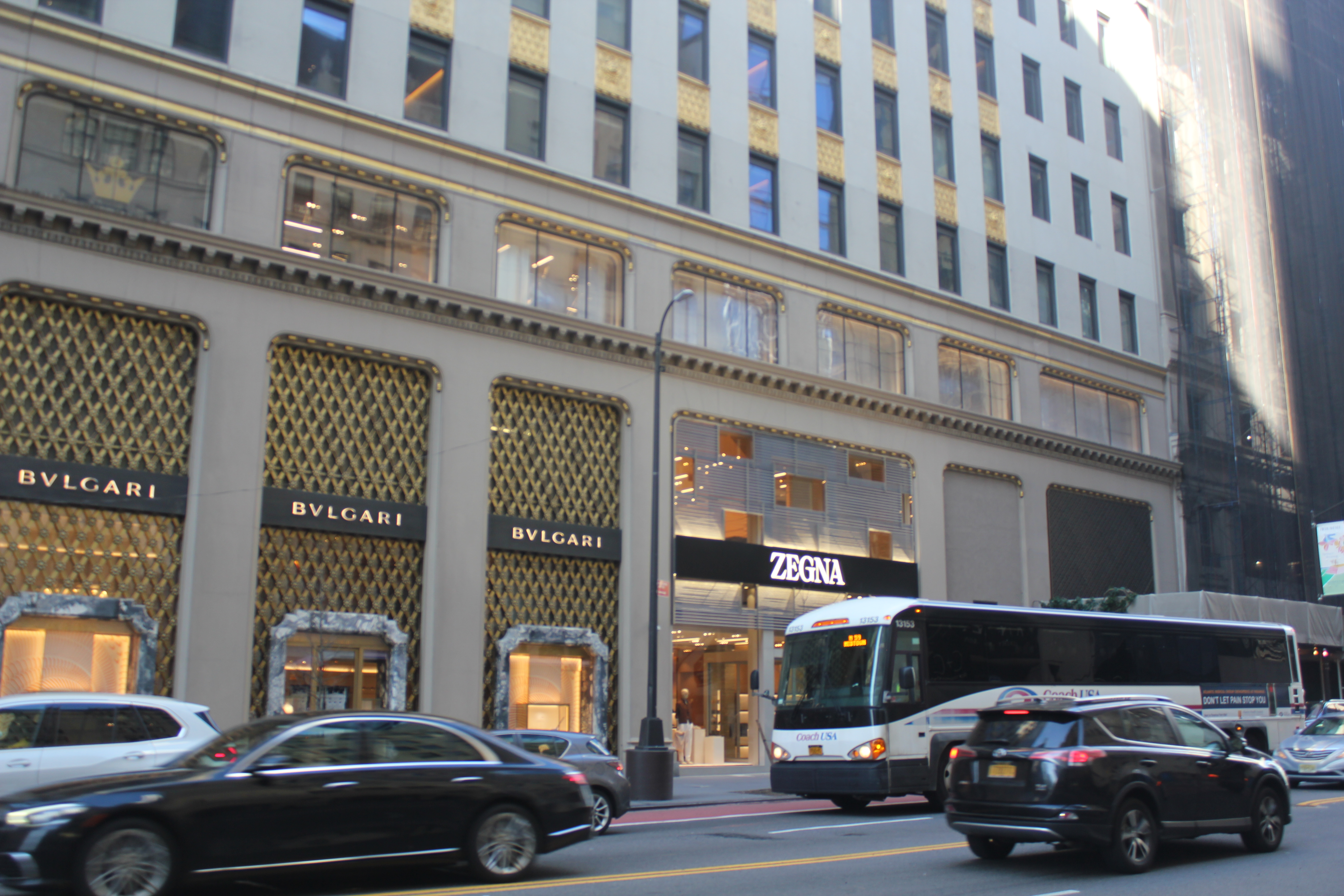
Stores along the 57th Street side of the Crown Building

During the 1940s, space in the building was leased to tenants such as dressmaker Wilma Gowns, perfume seller Parfums Charbert, and the Motion Picture Sales Corporation. In addition, the building's weather vane was removed in 1942 to provide scrap metal for World War II. In January 1946, Charles F. Noyes and a partner agreed to buy the building as an investment for Noyes's family. At the time, the structure was earning $700,000 in rent per year. It was valued at $4.875 million for tax purposes. The sale was finalized the next month. Noyes gave his ownership stake to his daughter, whom media sources referred to as "Mrs. Duncan M. Findlay", and the developer Joseph Durst was revealed as Noyes's partner. The Herald Tribune wrote that Durst had urged Noyes to buy the building after several other developers had expressed interest in the building, and that Noyes had rejected an outside offer of $5 million for the building.

Durst and Duncan Findlay received a $4.15 million mortgage loan for the building in mid-1949. The Durst and Findlay families sold the building in November 1950 to Kenneth S. Keyes, who represented two anonymous Cuban investors. The buyers paid $1.965 million in cash and took over the building's existing $4.01 million mortgage. By then, the building's tenants paid about $1 million in annual rent and occupied about 300,000 square feet (28,000 m^{2}) of office space. Further space was leased in the 1950s and 1960s to tenants such as specialty shop Blackton-Fifth Avenue Ltd., the U.S. Senate campaign offices of Herbert Lehman, talent agency Mercury Artists, paint company Martin-Senour, and cosmetic and perfume company Lanvin-Charles of the Ritz.

The building was renamed the Genesco Building in 1964 when Genesco became a major tenant. At the time, Genesco owned an I. Miller shoe store at the base and the Bonwit Teller department store across the street. In 1966, the building was sold to Centurion Real Estate Inc. Paul Goldberger of The New York Times wrote in the 1970s that the base of the Genesco Building contained a wooden tent which housed the I. Miller store. By the late 1970s, Centurion reported that the building was nearly fully occupied.

=== Marcos ownership ===
==== Acquisition, renovation, and new tenants ====
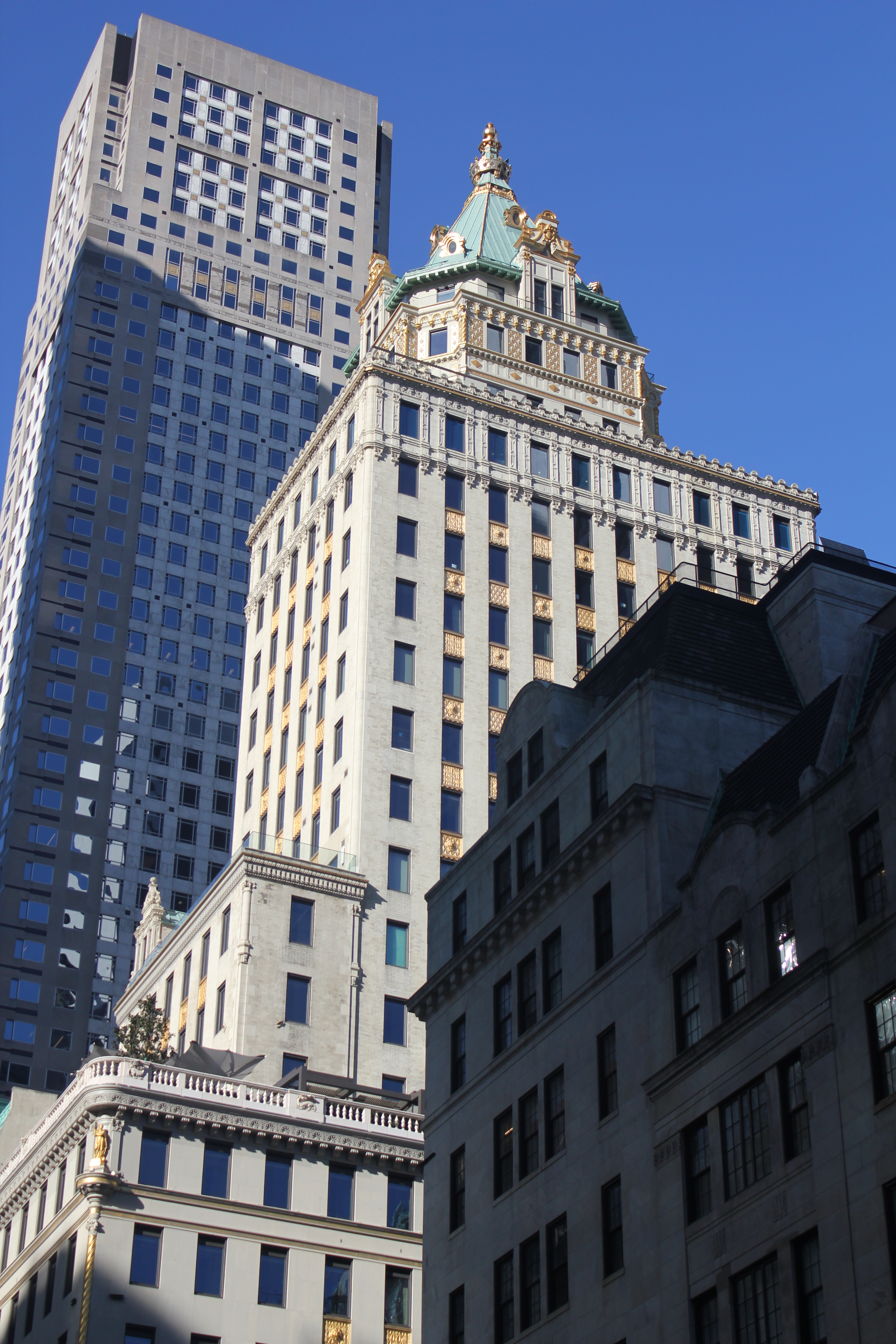
The Crown Building as seen from one block north. 712 Fifth Avenue is in the background, and the Bergdorf Goodman Building is in the foreground.

The Genesco Building at 730 Fifth Avenue was sold in September 1981 to Ralph and Joseph Bernstein of the New York Land Company, which was initially reported to be representing an anonymous Canadian investment group. New York Land was working on behalf of Imelda Marcos, the wife of Philippine dictator Ferdinand Marcos, who purchased it through a Dutch Antillean company named Lastura Corp. N.V. Lastura, in turn, was owned by a Panamanian shell company. (Note: The owner of the Lastura Corporation has been variously cited as Trade & Commodities S.A., Paneles Porcelanizados S.A., and Yewell Compagnie Immobiliere S.A. Lastura itself was subsequently renamed the Canadian Land Company, then Crown Building N.V.) In a subsequent criminal case, one witness testified that Ferdinand Marcos was initially reluctant to buy the building, but relented after his wife tearfully pleaded for him to purchase it. The acquisition cost $51 million. Joseph Bernstein was designated as the trustee for Lastura Corp. N.V. According to later testimony from Bernstein, the Marcoses had obtained a loan to purchase the Crown Building, including $34 million from BNP Paribas. Marcos also received a $30 million loan from Bangko Sentral ng Pilipinas, the Philippines Central Bank; he allegedly forced an associate to submit a fraudulent loan application to the bank.

The Genesco Building was renamed the Crown Building in 1983, after its crown-like look when illuminated at night. New York Land subsequently spent $15 million on redecorating the building, and it paid another $70 million to buy and renovate a Korvettes storefront in the building. The new owners added 23-karat gold leaf to the building's facade, reportedly to compete with the decorations on the then-new Trump Tower across Fifth Avenue. New York Land hired lighting designer Douglas Leigh to renovate the building's exterior lighting. Leigh also added floodlights atop the Tiffany, Manufacturers Hanover, and Bergdorf Goodman buildings, at the other three corners of the intersection of Fifth Avenue and 57th Street, to match the Crown Building's lights. The new lights atop all four buildings were activated in January 1983, though local businesses complained about the brightness and glare created by the other three buildings' lights. New York Land funded the installation of a large illuminated snowflake-shaped object above Fifth Avenue and 57th Street, and they upgraded the elevators as well.

During the 1980s, a group of 38 art galleries leased the building's second and third floors. Other new tenants during that decade included a store for Salvatore Ferragamo S.p.A., a temporary construction office for Donald Trump, the headquarters of fashion brand Pierre Cardin, and a jewelry gallery. New York Land also wanted to market the office space to large firms, so it paid some of the smaller tenants to move out. Shoe companies opened showrooms within the building. The retail space was being rented for about $500 per square foot ($5,400/m^{2}) by the late 1980s, making it among the world's most expensive retail space. Among the retail tenants at that time were Bulgari and Sharper Image. Also during that decade, preservationists had proposed designating the Crown Building as a contributing property to a planned historic district along the midtown section of Fifth Avenue. The historic district was never created.

==== Attempted sales ====
In August 1985, opposition politicians in the National Assembly of the Philippines submitted a complaint in an unsuccessful attempt to impeach Marcos; the complaint alleged that Imelda Marcos had bought the Crown Building in 1981. A United States House of Representatives committee found that the Bernsteins had been working on behalf of Marcos, who had intended the building and several others as a gift for his wife Imelda. (Note: Marcos was also found to have purchased several other New York City buildings; see Overseas landholdings of the Marcos family.) The Washington Post reported that in coded cables between the Marcos family and their alleged "front" in Manhattan, Gliceria Tantoco, the Crown Building was referred to using the code word "Ferragamo". By February 1986, the Crown Building and three other buildings reportedly owned by the Marcoses were being placed for sale. Around that time, the Bernsteins were contemplating paying $250 million for the Crown Building and two of the other buildings. The Bernsteins alleged that they paid $235 million for the Crown Building, Herald Center, and 40 Wall Street, but the Philippine government claimed that the sale was never finalized. The Saudi arms dealer Adnan Khashoggi also claimed to be involved with the building's purchase; he asserted that he had owned the building for several years before the Bernsteins' alleged purchase.

After Marcos was forced out of office, the administration of his successor Corazon Aquino froze Marcos's assets within U.S. banking channels in March 1986. As a result, the building's tax bills went unpaid. A lawyer alleged that the building's value was declining under the Bernsteins' management. After a U.S. circuit court ruled to block the sale of the Marcos properties in November 1986, Aquino's administration filed a lawsuit against the Marcos estate to obtain title to the buildings. Security Pacific Bank held one of the building's mortgage loans, which was worth either $60 million or $76 million by 1989. Two additional mortgages, totaling $39 million, were held by Mabari, a Liechtenstein foundation originally operated by Khashoggi. The Marcoses defaulted on the Security Pacific loan in 1987, and the loan had been foreclosed upon by the following year. Federal judge Pierre N. Leval ruled in 1988 that the building could be sold at a foreclosure auction. The first through third floors, which were leased to I. Miller and then re-leased to Bulgari, were exempted from the foreclosure auction because I. Miller's lease had been negotiated long before the Marcoses obtained the building.

The Crown Building's disposition was unresolved for several years because the Philippine government, the Bernsteins, and Khashoggi each claimed ownership over it. The Aquino administration attempted in early 1989 to sell the four Marcos properties to Morris Bailey for $398 million, over the objections of the Bernsteins and Khashoggi. Khashoggi was also accused of helping the Marcoses hide their stakes in their buildings, although he was acquitted of all racketeering charges relating to the properties. By late 1989, Leval was planning a foreclosure auction for the building, setting the minimum bid at $125 million. The auction was originally scheduled for that October, but it was rescheduled eight times due to uncertainty over who owned the structure. An unidentified buyer offered $120 million for the building the following year.

=== Spitzer, Winter, and Greene ownership ===
The Aquino administration, Khashoggi, and the Bernsteins settled their conflicting claims to the building in late 1990, agreeing to split the profits after the building was sold and the mortgage was paid off. By then, the building was half-empty. There had been few attempts to attract new tenants or maintain the building during the late 1980s, and its largest tenant had moved out. The Crown Building was sold in February 1991 to real-estate developers Bernard Spitzer, Marvin Winter, and Jerome L. Greene for $93.6 million, only a few thousand dollars above Security Pacific's bid. After the $89 million mortgage and various taxes were paid off, comparatively little remained; the Philippine government received about $3,000 in total. To attract tenants, Spitzer and his partners subdivided the interior space and advertised the building's location, design, and floor areas; they had managed to lease 10 percent of the empty space by the end of 1991.

The building was 80 percent occupied by 1993, with foreign companies comprising many of the new tenants. The building's occupants during the 1990s included fashion designer Louis Féraud, fashion designer Laura Biagiotti, art gallery Kennedy Galleries, fashion showroom Falmola, antique dealer Israel Sack, and watch company Piaget SA. Luxury goods store Bruno Magli leased the penthouse, while other office space was occupied by fashion firm Mondo Inc., lifestyle magazine Playboy, and hotel chain Sun International. Despite the owners' initial failure to attract art-gallery owners to the building, by the mid-1990s the Crown Building was in high demand among art galleries. An executive for the building's leasing agent, Cushman & Wakefield, said that they wanted to lease the space to high-end tenants. The owners also leased out some prebuilt office space in the building. In addition, the Bulgari store in the building was renovated and expanded in 1997.

During the 2000s, the building gained tenants such as a Smythson stationery store, a Vidal Sassoon fashion salon, a Gilan jewelry showroom, and the headquarters of the Nina Footwear Corporation (which had acquired I. Miller). In addition, the building had a coworking space. After Spitzer's son Eliot Spitzer resigned as the governor of New York, Eliot had an office at the Crown Building. When Bernard Spitzer died in 2014, Eliot continued to operate the building alongside the Winter family.

=== Redevelopment ===
==== Sales ====
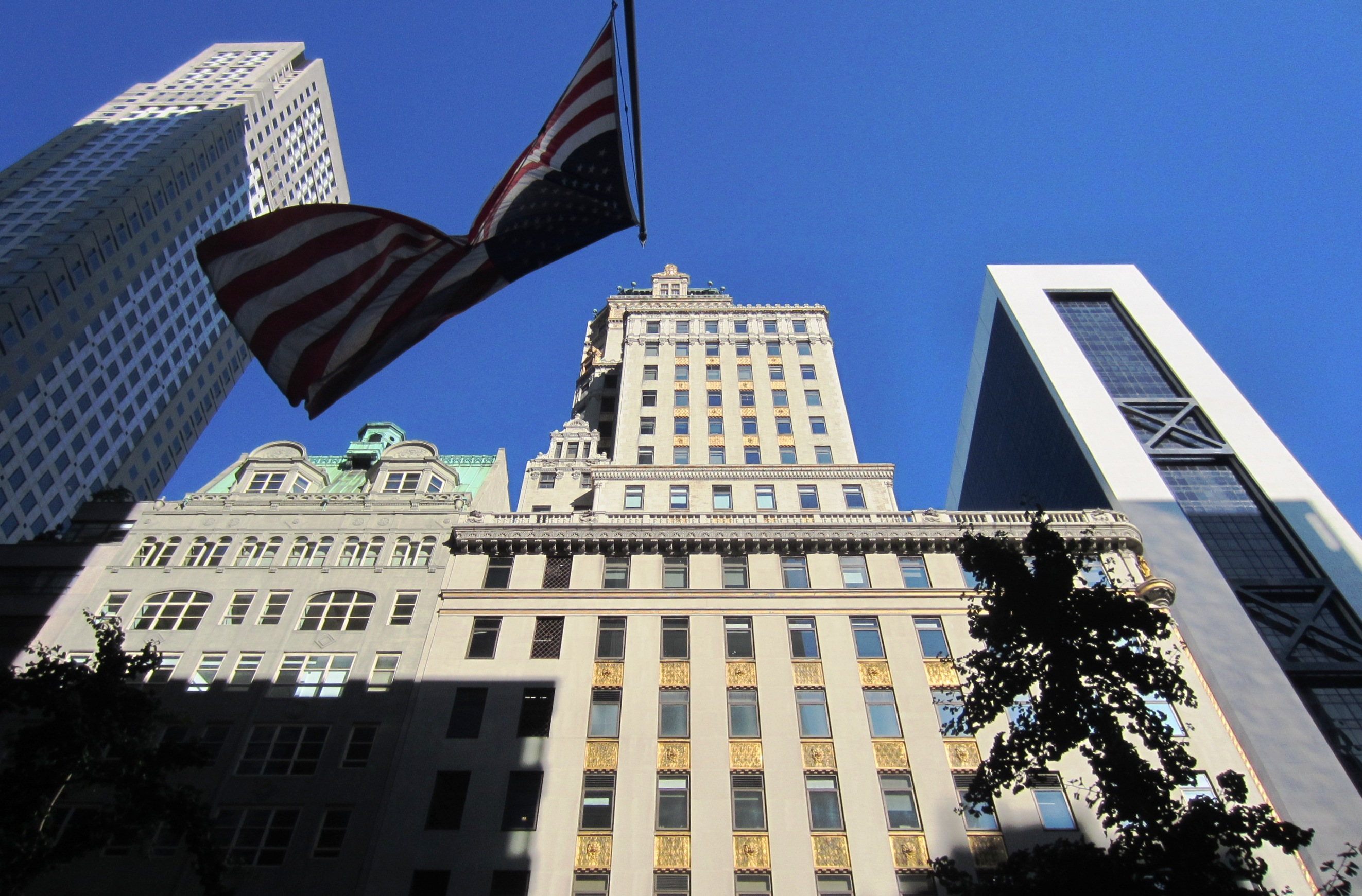
Seen from Fifth Avenue

In December 2014, Eliot Spitzer and the Winters began looking to sell the building for at least $1.8 billion. Jeff Sutton's Wharton Properties and Sandeep Mathrani's General Growth Properties purchased the building for about $1.75 billion that month, (Note: The price has also been cited as $1.77 billion or $1.78 billion.) including both the office space and the lower-story retail space. The sale price of $4,490 per square foot ($48,300/m^{2}) made the Crown Building the world's costliest office building per square foot at the time. Though the sale was one of the largest deals in New York City real estate history, one observer predicted that the retail space alone was worth more than the price paid for the whole structure. The retail tenants, Bulgari, Zegna, and K. Mikimoto & Co, were paying less than the market rate, though most of the tenants' leases expired in seven years or less. In addition, the office space was occupied by companies such as private-equity firm Apollo Global Management and investment manager Kohlberg Kravis Roberts.

Wharton and General Growth finalized their purchase in April 2015. That month, developer Michael Shvo and Russian billionaire Vladislav Doronin purchased the top 21 stories for about $500 million. Shvo and Doronin beat out several other large bidders, including the Blackstone Group, the Carlyle Group, and LVMH. Shvo and Doronin announced plans to convert and redevelop their portion of the Crown Building into the Aman New York, a luxury hotel and residences. The hotel and residences would be operated by Doronin's Aman Resorts and would be the third Aman resort located in a city. Some of the building's office tenants began leaving after the sale was announced, while other tenants, including several art galleries, were forced out of the office space against their wishes.

Wharton and General Growth also evicted tenants on the lower stories so these areas could be converted to retail space. They leased out two of the building's storefronts at rates that greatly exceeded the area's $3,324 per square foot ($35,780/m^{2}) average. Bulgari signed a new lease in late 2015, reducing its space to 3,675 square feet (341.4 m^{2}), and Zegna leased 9,000 square feet (840 m^{2}) on the first and second floors in March 2016. The last non-retail tenant in the base, ICM Partners, moved out in June 2016.

==== Hotel conversion ====
Mikimoto renovated its 1,800-square-foot (170 m^{2}) store at the building in 2016. Shvo and Doronin submitted a condominium offering plan to the New York Attorney General's office that November. Early plans called for 79 hotel rooms on the 4th through 9th stories; three floors of amenity space; and 26 residential condos above the 11th story. The terms of the Aman New York's condo offering allowed the developers to rent out some of the apartments as hotel rooms. Following allegations of corruption against Shvo, he was ousted as one of the hotel's developers by September 2017, although Shvo still owned a partial stake in the project. Doronin estimated that the penthouse apartment would be sold for $100 million, while the other units would be sold for at least $4 million. Doronin also planned to add large terraces and outdoor pools to the setbacks. The Crown Building's Bulgari store opened in October 2017 following a renovation designed by Peter Marino.

In March 2018, a buyer offered $180 million for the Aman's penthouse, making it one of the highest-priced residential sales in the U.S.; however, the sale was not finalized. Doronin received a $284 million loan for the hotel portion of the building that December. The Zegna store at the building's base was also redesigned by Marino and reopened in February 2019. By mid-2019, there were buyers for about half of the building's apartments, despite decreased demand for luxury apartments along the nearby Billionaires' Row. The sales office was open only to invited guests who first underwent an extensive background check. At the time, the condos were being sold for between $4.7 million and $83 million, even though public sales had not even begun. Also in 2019, Wharton and General Growth sought a $900 million loan to refinance the building's retail space, and Apollo Global agreed to provide $807 million that August. Sutton sold most of his stake in the retail space to Brookfield Properties that month, reportedly due to dissatisfaction over the terms of the refinancing. Doronin's OKO Group received $750 million in construction loans in October 2019 to renovate the upper levels.

Jean-Michel Gathy was hired to renovate the hotel portion of the building, while the brokerage Douglas Elliman was hired to place the residential condos on sale. Residential sales at the Crown Building commenced in January 2020, and the first units became available in early 2021. The project included adding design details such as fireplaces between windows, which, according to Gathy, helped to make the building "luxurious". The completion of the renovation had to be postponed due to the COVID-19 pandemic in New York City, and the project had also incurred 34 violations of city building codes by early 2021. One worker died after falling down a chute in the building, and the city fined the developer $12,500 as a result. Most of the building's apartments had been sold by the end of 2021. Doronin sought to refinance the hotel in early 2022, and he refinanced the hotel that June with a $754 million loan from JPMorgan Chase. Buyers began finalizing their purchases in mid-2022. Of the first 12 buyers to finalize their purchases, five had paid more than $20 million each; Doronin predicted that the apartments would sell for a total of $893 million. The hotel renovation cost $1.45 billion.

==== Hotel opening and 2020s ====
The Aman New York opened on August 11, 2022. The cheapest rooms rented for $3,200 or $3,400 a night, making the Aman the city's most expensive hotel. The Aman also had a private club that, at the time of the hotel's opening, had an upfront membership fee of $200,000, excluding the $15,000 annual renewal fee. The New York Times reported that, at the Aman's opening, there was so much demand for the hotel that even some of the club's members had difficulties reserving rooms. The following month, Doronin considered selling the hotel portion of the building for at least $600 million, though Aman would continue to operate the hotel. A Chopard watch shop opened at the building's base in December 2022. Three of the building's apartments ranked among the most expensive apartments in New York City during 2022. The purchasers of the condos included a trust operated by Meta Platforms and Hong Kong businessman Terence Chan. In 2023, some of the condo owners began renting out their homes to hotel guests.

The fashion house Chanel opened a two-story store at the Crown Building's base, its first standalone watch-and-jewelry boutique in the United States, in February 2024. By the next month, sales had been finalized for 17 of the condos. In addition, fashion house Prada bought one of the commercial condo units in April 2024 for $12.6 million. On May 14, 2024, the New York City Landmarks Preservation Commission designated the Crown Building as an official city landmark. The following month, the businessman Serdar Bilgili sued Shvo over the latter's ownership stake in the Crown Building. Bilgili claimed that he had acquired a one-third interest in Shvo's ownership stake in 2015 and that Shvo had reduced their ownership stakes through a set of capital calls. By the middle of the year, five of the condos had sold for over $50 million. Doronin bought his own hotel's penthouse for $135 million, making it New York City's highest-priced residential sale in 2024. The first resale of an apartment at the Aman New York occurred that July, and all except one of the condos had been sold by the next month. The final unit was sold for $66 million by January 2025. That July, Brookfield refinanced the retail space with a $601 million loan.

== Reception ==
=== Architectural commentary ===
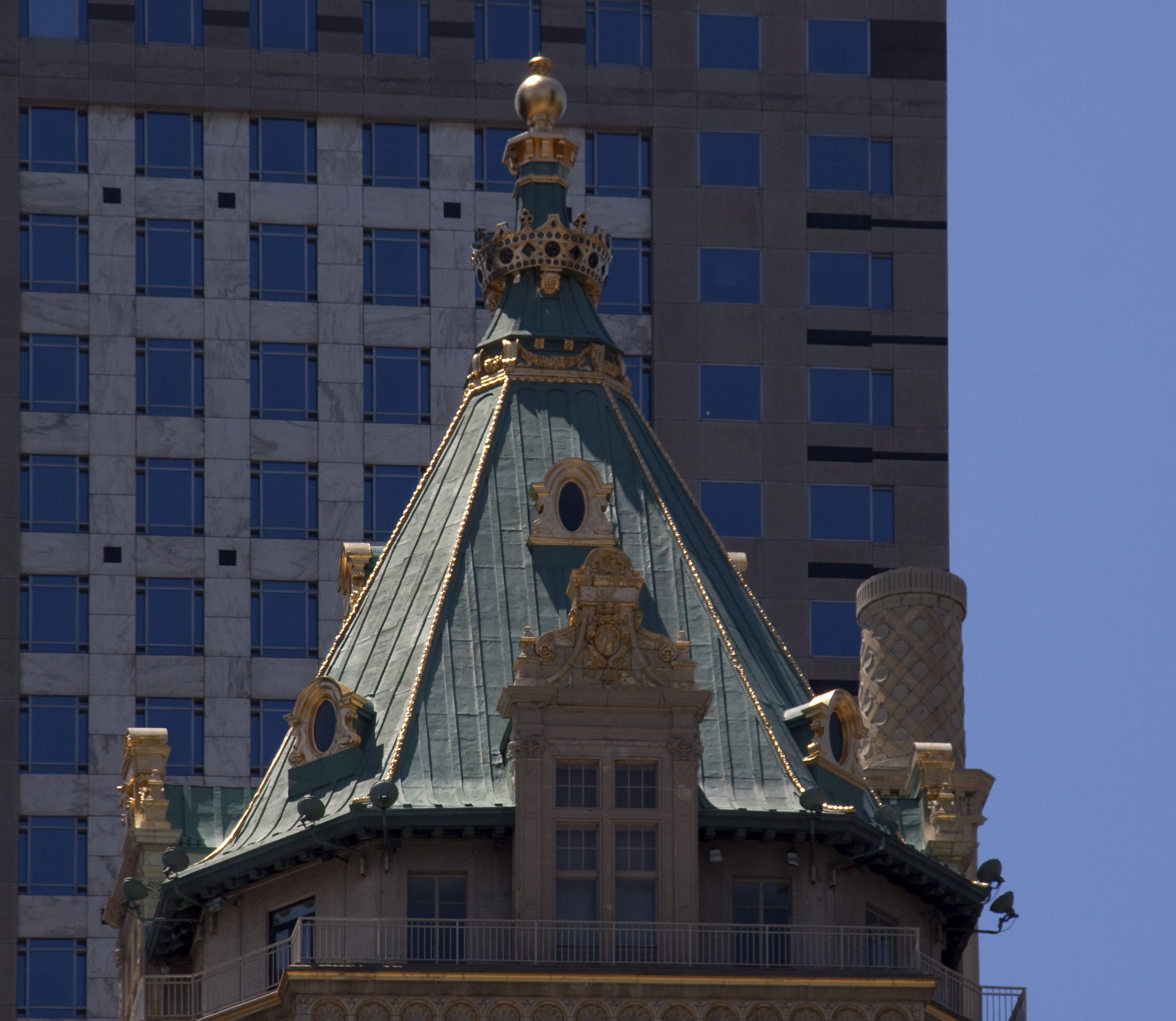
The building's roof

When the Heckscher Building was being planned, the New-York Tribune wrote that the structure exemplified the commercial and architectural changes taking place on Fifth Avenue. The New York Herald called the structure a "cathedral of commerce", while Heckscher himself called it the "tower of trade". As the building was being completed in 1921, Aymar Embury II wrote in Architectural Forum magazine that the building's massing was "perhaps as attractive as that of any in the city", aside from the Woolworth Building. The same year, the New York World wrote that the Heckscher Building was one of several new skyscrapers that exemplified the idea of the pyramid-roofed tower. The Real Estate Record surmised that the building would serve as "a beautiful background" for Fifth Avenue's mansions.

Following the building's completion, the architect Harvey Wiley Corbett stated that the Heckscher Building had a "very pleasing contour", especially its topmost portion, and was "more interesting certainly than the old buildings" further down Fifth Avenue. The Guardian described the building as a "lovely slight from all the southern part of Central Park", particularly its golden pinnacle. The writer Willard Gilman Myers wrote that the building's roof had one of New York City's most beautiful pinnacles in New York City and that the structure "soars above the Vanderbilt chateau with a Gallic grace that has little of the heavier beauty of its sisters to the south". Conversely, George Harold Edgell regarded the design as "not wholly successful" because of the excessive emphasis placed on horizontal design elements.

Writing retrospectively in 1976, Paul Goldberger said that the building's roof "made it an early and significant presence on the Fifth Avenue skyline". After Douglas Leigh replaced the building's lighting in the 1980s, Goldberger wrote that the "intricate mix of gilding and lighting [...] works superbly", though architect Patricia Conway regarded the gilding as "rather excessive, and not architecturally appropriate". In his 1987 book New York 1930, Robert A. M. Stern wrote that the presence of the Heckscher Building "signaled a new scale of development" along 57th Street. The Wall Street Journal described the original building as being "a monument to the Beaux-Arts movement" when it was built.

=== Hotel commentary ===
Following the Crown Building's conversion into a hotel, a writer for Elite Traveler wrote that the subtleness of the hotel room's design details contributed to their luxurious feel. A critic for the Condé Nast Traveler described going through the hotel as akin to a "nesting process" and said that "walking down the hotel's hushed, cream-colored hallways and reaching your suite feels like making it to the inner sanctum". A writer for Town and Country magazine stated that there was an "interesting juxtaposition between Aman's glossy modernism and its new home's old Beaux-Arts bones", describing the interiors as having a serene atmosphere.

In the inaugural edition of the World's 50 Best Hotels, the Aman was ranked as the 25th-best hotel in the world, as well as the highest-ranked hotel in the United States on that list. The first edition of the Michelin Keys Guide, in 2024, ranked the Aman New York as a "three-key" hotel, the highest accolade granted by the Michelin Keys Guide. The Aman was one of 11 Michelin three-key hotels across the United States and one of four such hotels in New York City.

== See also ==
- List of hotels in New York City
- List of New York City Designated Landmarks in Manhattan from 14th to 59th Streets
