= Capital Hill Residence =

Building in Barvikha, Russia

Coordinates: 55.7227°N 37.2573°E

Capital Hill Residence is a villa located on the north-face hillside of Barvikha, a town west of Moscow.

== History ==
It was designed by Iraqi / British architect Zaha Hadid and Patrik Schumacher of Zaha Hadid Architects for property developer Vladislav Doronin. Construction on the project began in 2006 and it is the only private house that Hadid built during her lifetime. The house was completed in a futuristic style with an area of 2,650 square meters with four floors. Estimated to have cost $140 million, it is one of the most expensive, luxurious and unusual residences in the world.

== See also ==
- Neofuturism
