= Kristina Romanova =

Russian fashion model, CEO, and activist (born 1994)

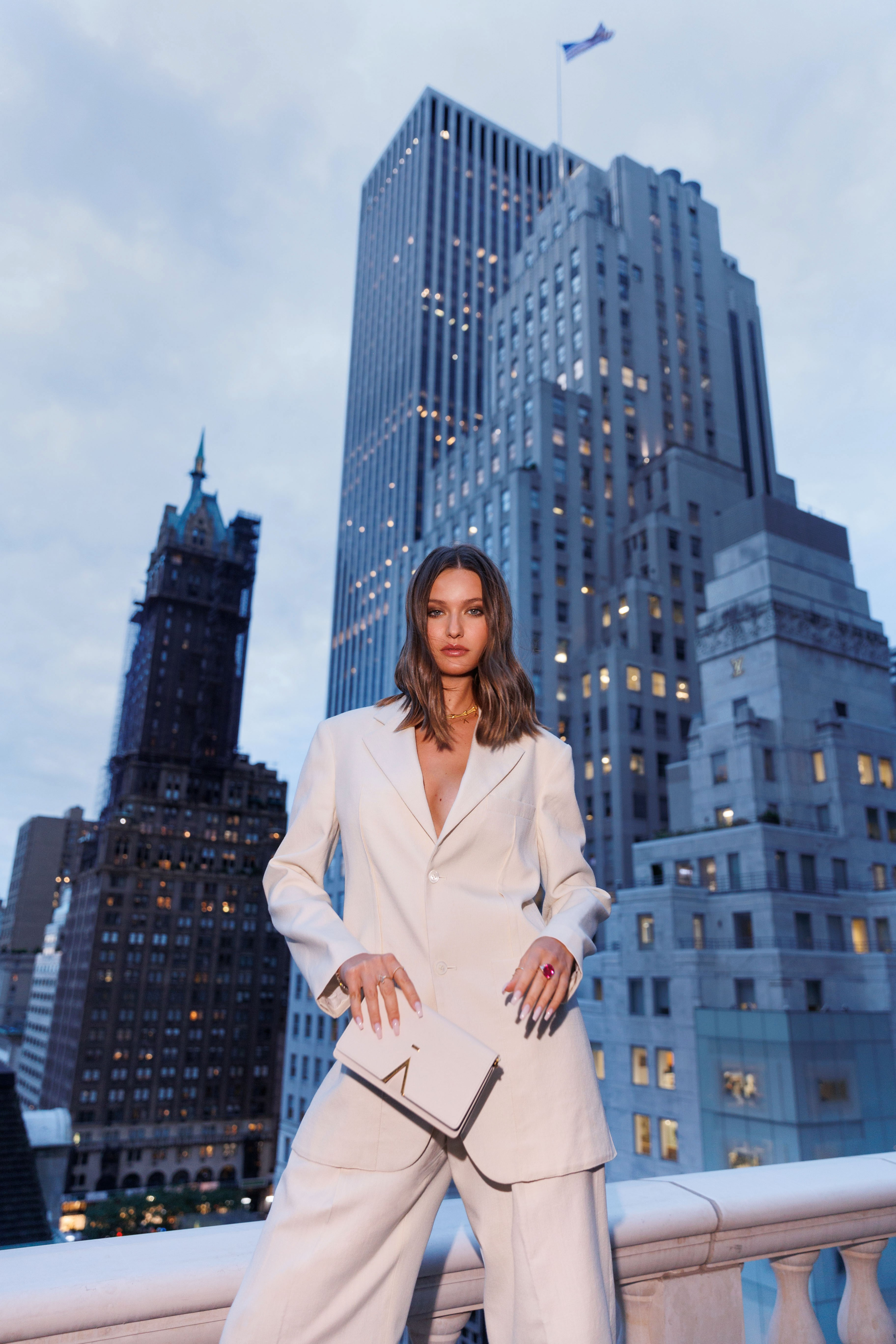
- Romanova in 2022
- Born: Kristina Romanova; 11 June 1994 (age 32); Volgograd, Russia
- Occupations: Fashion model; CEO
- Years active: 2010–present
- Partner: Vladislav Doronin (2015–present)
- Children: 2
- Modeling information
- Height: 1.80 m (5 ft 11 in)
- Hair color: Brown
- Eye color: Blue
- Agency: Women Management (New York, Milan, Paris); Elite Model Management (London); Traffic Models (Barcelona); Modelwerk (Hamburg); METRO Models (Zurich); V.G. Model Management (Volvograd) (mother agency)

Kristina Romanova (Russian: Кристина Романова; born 11 June 1994) is a Russian fashion model. She is the CEO and creative director of Aman Essentials.

== Career ==
Romanova was recruited for modeling when she was 16 and moved to New York City. She debuted in BCBG in 2010. She walked for and became the face of campaigns for Ralph Lauren (2011-2015), Marc Jacobs (2010), Jil Sander, D&G, Alexander McQueen, Jean-Paul Gaultier, and Yohji Yamamoto that season. She has also walked for Moschino, Alberta Ferretti, D&G, and Dries Van Noten.

Romanova was the face of Vera Wang's Princess perfume from 2013-2023.

In 2020, Romanova was appointed Head of Retail for Aman. In 2022, she became CEO of Aman Essentials, a luxury retail brand of Aman Resorts. Her approach to beauty and the brand is skinimalism, focusing on simplicity and effectivity. In 2023, Romanova partnered with Kosé to introduce Amman Essential Skin, distributed in Aman resorts.

In 2018, as part of the MeToo movement, Romanova and Antoniette Costa collaborated to create Humans of Fashion, a non-profit and app for addressing abuse and misconduct in the modeling and fashion industries.

In 2013, she starred in the music video for the song "Wake Me Up" by the Swedish DJ Avicii.

== Personal life ==
Romanova began a relationship with real estate developer Vladislav Doronin in 2015. They have two children.
