= OKO Group =

International real estate development firm

- Industry: Real estate firm
- Founded: 2015; 11 years ago
- Founder: Vladislav Doronin
- Headquarters: Miami, Florida
- Key people: Vanessa Grout, CEO
- Website: okogroup.com

The OKO Group is an international real estate development firm created by businessman, Vladislav Doronin. The company develops real estate projects in Miami and New York City.

== History ==
Doronin founded the Miami-based OKO Group in 2015. The word "oko" means "eye" in Proto-Slavic.

In 2014, Doronin and a partner paid $48 million to purchase a 44-year-old condo that overlooks Biscayne Bay in Miami at 175 S.E. 25th Street. The building, built in 1971, sits on close to an acre of Bayfront property with 150 feet of waterfront. The OKO Group plans to build a 47-story luxury condo building on the site.

In early 2016, OKO opened an office in Miami’s Design District at 4100 Northeast Second Avenue. The office spans about 3500 square feet.

In July 2016, the firm announced a residential development of a 649-foot, 57-story tower, Missoni Baia, located at 700 Northeast 26th Terrace. This will be the first residential project for the Italian fashion house, Missoni, with their home collection and designs used throughout the building's public spaces. The architect, Hani Rashid of Asymptote Architecture, was inspired by modern minimalist artists, Sol LeWitt, Dan Flavin and James Turrell. The project's landscaping is by Swiss landscape architect Enzo Enea, and the interiors were designed by New York-based Paris Forino. In October 2016, it was announced that Adrian Smith + Gordon Gill Architecture would design the condo tower, the firm's first project in Miami.

In November 2016, OKO Group paid $54 million for a two-acre site fronting Biscayne Bay, Florida. The property at 720 Northeast 27th Street was purchased from Jesuit Fathers of the Province of the Antilles, and has 475 feet of water frontage. In 2019, OKO Group announced plans for a $1.3 billion hotel and residential development occupying the Crown Building in Manhattan.

In 2020, the company acquired three full blocks of Miami real estate for $63 million. In June 2020 Vanessa Grout was appointed as CEO of OKO Group. In April 2021, OKO Group received a $128 million construction loan to build to a luxury condominium tower in Brickell, Miami.

In 2022, OKO Group and Cain bought buildings in Palm Beach for $147 million.
