= Capital Group (Russia) =

Property developer based in Moscow

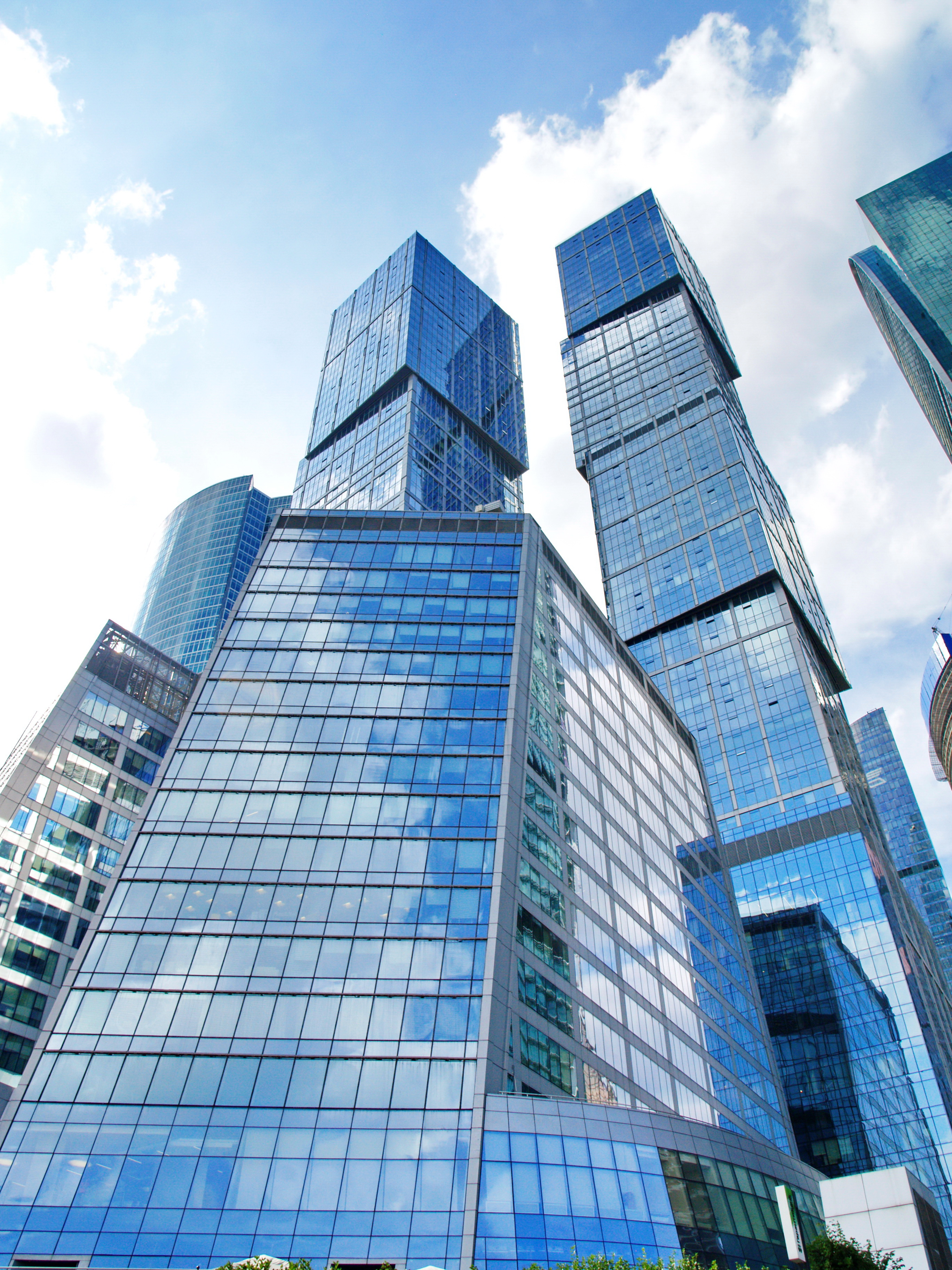
- City of Capitals, the location of the group's headquarters
- Native name: Капитал Груп
- Type: Private
- Industry: Real estate development
- Incorporated: Russia
- Founded: 1991 or 1993 (see History)
- Founders: Vladislav Doronin; Eduard Berman; Pavel Tio
- Headquarters: City of Capitals, Moscow, Russia
- Area served: Russia (primarily Moscow)
- Key people: Pavel Tio (chairman of the board of directors); Mikhail Khvesko (chief executive officer and chairman of the management board)
- Products: Commercial property; Educational facilities; Industrial parks; Mixed-use developments; Residential property
- Brands: Capital Industry
- Services: Property management
- Revenue: 35,000,000,000 Russian ruble (2015)
- Owner: Pavel Tio (principal owner)
- Website: www.capitalgroup.ru/en

Capital Group (Russian: Капитал Груп) is a Russian real estate development group based in Moscow, where it has operated since the early 1990s. It develops residential, commercial and mixed-use projects, specialising in premium and luxury property.

The group also redevelops former industrial sites and builds industrial parks and educational facilities. At the CRE Awards, Capital Group was named Developer of the Year in 2012 and 2020 and received the special Developer of the Decade award in 2013.

== History ==
Accounts of the company's founding differ. RBC reported that Vladislav Doronin founded Capital Group in 1991 and that Eduard Berman and Pavel Tio became shareholders in 1993–1994. Forbes dates the company's launch to 1993 and names all three as founders.

In November 2008, the industry publication Commercial Real Estate reported that, at the end of 2007, the group's parent company was C.I.T. Capital Investments Limited, registered in Cyprus. At that time, Doronin, Berman and Tio held equal beneficial interests, according to the report.

In 2016, Tio succeeded Doronin as chairman of the board of directors. In September 2025, Mikhail Khvesko became chief executive officer and chairman of the management board. Former chief executive Valentina Stanovova remained on both boards, with a focus on the investment business.

== Ownership ==
The Forbes company profile, current as of 28 October 2025, identified Pavel Tio as Capital Group's principal owner and chairman of the board of directors.

According to extracts from Russia's Unified State Register of Legal Entities dated 20 August 2026, Holding Development LLC held a 100% interest in Capital Group LLC (OGRN 1027700083817). Holding Development LLC's registered members were Pavel Tio (80%), Gennady Khvesko (10%) and Valentina Stanovova (10%). Its registered managing organisation was Capital Group Razvitie LLC. Tio was also the sole registered member of Capital Group Razvitie LLC.

In August 2022, The Aspen Times reported that Doronin had held a one-third interest in the related company Capital Group Development LLC until 14 April that year, when he transferred it to his mother, Zinaida Doronina. A lawyer representing Capital Group Development said that the transfer was intended to reduce exposure to possible Russian sanctions against foreign nationals and to distance Doronin from Moscow following the Russian invasion of Ukraine.

== Activities ==
In 2016, RBC reported that Capital Group's portfolio included more than 70 completed, ongoing and planned projects covering more than 7 million square metres. In September 2026, RBC put the portfolio at more than 11 million square metres. It also identified Capital Group as, among its other projects, the operator of two developments: City-2, adjoining the Moscow International Business Center, and the redevelopment of the MiG site on Leningradsky Prospekt.

According to Kommersant, payments into escrow accounts from Capital Group's residential sales reached 102 billion roubles in 2022. Reporting on the 2024 Forbes developer ranking, TASS put Capital Group's sales at 112 billion roubles. TASS said the ranking was based on sales in 2023 and the first half of 2024.

=== Industrial and educational facilities ===
Capital Group developed the Alabushevo industrial park in Zelenograd, within the Technopolis Moscow special economic zone. The first phase was commissioned in 2024; the company announced the launch of the second phase in May 2026. In March 2026, Moscow State University of Civil Engineering reported that Capital Group had won a tender for an investment agreement covering the design and construction of a teaching and research building on its campus.

=== University partnerships ===
In December 2018, Plekhanov Russian University of Economics reorganised its existing Project and Programme Management Department as a partner department named after Capital Group. According to the university, the company contributes to the curricula, while students receive practical teaching at its construction sites and paid placements in its departments. Through its Capital University programme, the group also works with universities to offer student placements and lectures. In July 2025, Moscow State University of Civil Engineering reported an agreement to send student construction teams to the company's projects.

== Projects ==
=== Selected completed developments ===
The dates below refer either to the completion of construction or to the issue of a commissioning permit. Individual developments may have been delivered in stages.

Selected Capital Group developments in Moscow
Development	Location	Architecture	Completion or commissioning	Sources
Medny 3.14	14 Donskaya Street, Moscow	Sergey Skuratov Architects	2nd quarter of 2021	
Kutuzovsky 12	12 Kutuzovsky Prospekt, Moscow	Tsimailo Lyashenko and Partners	19 March 2020 (commissioning permit)	
White Khamovniki	9 Olsufyevsky Lane, Moscow	Tsimailo Lyashenko and Partners	13 December 2021 (commissioning permit)	
Capital Towers	Krasnopresnenskaya Embankment, Moscow	Sergey Skuratov Architects	28 April 2023 (three residential towers commissioned)	

==== Kutuzovsky 12 ====
Kutuzovsky 12 is a residential development at 12 Kutuzovsky Prospekt in Dorogomilovo District, part of Moscow's Western Administrative Okrug. The project was developed by Capital Group. Russia's state housing construction register (EISZhS) lists OOO Nova-Lait, a limited liability company, as the registered project developer. Its commissioning permit was issued on 19 March 2020. The 11-storey building has a total area of approximately 18,000 square metres (190,000 sq ft) and contains 81 apartments and a two-level underground car park with 131 spaces. The building was designed by Tsimailo Lyashenko and Partners. Its facade includes a colonnade illuminated at night.

==== White Khamovniki ====
White Khamovniki is a Capital Group residential development at 9 Olsufyevsky Lane in Khamovniki District, part of Moscow's Central Administrative Okrug. Designed by Tsimailo Lyashenko and Partners, it comprises two 15-storey blocks joined by a podium. Early plans described in 2019 called for 76 apartments. When the development received its commissioning permit on 13 December 2021, the city authorities reported 62 apartments, a total floor area of 17,184 square metres (184,970 sq ft) and 120 underground parking spaces. The same report outlined plans to landscape the development's 0.47-hectare (1.2-acre) internal grounds.

==== Capital Towers ====
Capital Towers comprises three residential towers on Krasnopresnenskaya Embankment, designed by Sergey Skuratov Architects. Moscow's construction supervision authority issued their commissioning permit, No. 77-01-011397-2023, on 28 April 2023. EISZhS identifies OOO Megapolis Group as the registered project developer. It lists the residential building recorded as object 19622 as completed. When the announcement was made in May 2023, work on the complex's podium was still under way as a separate phase.

In 2019, the Luxury Lifestyle Awards listed Capital Towers as a winner in its Real Estate Developer category for Moscow, Russia.

=== Developments in progress ===
Selected developments and reported schedules, October 2026
Development	Location in Moscow	Architect	Reported status or schedule	Sources
Badaevskiy	Kutuzovsky Prospekt / Taras Shevchenko Embankment	Herzog & de Meuron	Western residential block: commissioning announced in September 2026. Eastern residential component: planned commissioning in the fourth quarter of 2027. A separate non-residential component: planned commissioning in the third quarter of 2028.	
Dom Sporta	18 Druzhinnikovskaya Street	Sergey Skuratov Architects	Under construction; planned commissioning in the first quarter of 2029.	
Uzory	2nd Vrazhsky Lane	ATRIUM	Under construction; planned commissioning in the fourth quarter of 2028.	
MASTERS	Viktorenko Street	GAFA	Construction work reported in April 2026; planned commissioning in the fourth quarter of 2029.	

==== Badaevskiy ====
The Badaevskiy development occupies the site of the former Badaevskiy brewery in Moscow. Herzog & de Meuron's design combines new housing with the restoration of two surviving brewery buildings and the reconstruction of a demolished central building. The new housing is raised approximately 35 metres (115 ft) above ground on columns. The architects said the design was intended to leave room for a park beneath the buildings and preserve the visual connection between the historic structures and the river. The historic buildings are intended to house a food market, an arts centre and other public spaces. Apex Project Bureau is the executive architect and Vogt is the landscape architect.

EISZhS lists three components of the project, with the joint-stock company AO SZ Badaevskiy as their project developer. On 4 September 2026, Capital Group announced that the first phase, the western residential block, had received its commissioning permit and been assigned the address 12 Kutuzovsky Prospekt, building 4. Work on the eastern block was continuing. A registry check dated 29 September 2026 gave the fourth quarter of 2027 as the planned commissioning date for the eastern component, object 47431, under project declaration No. 77-002680. Commissioning of a separate non-residential component, object 70968, was scheduled for the third quarter of 2028 under project declaration No. 77-003311. A revised version of that declaration was published on 25 March 2026.

==== Dom Sporta ====
Dom of Sports Private park is a Capital Group project under construction at 18 Druzhinnikovskaya Street, designed by Sergey Skuratov Architects. EISZhS identifies OOO SZ A Klass, state registration number (OGRN) 1047796571734, as its project developer. A registry check dated 3 October 2026 gave the first quarter of 2029 as the planned commissioning date for the residential building registered as object 69376. The check also listed apartment handovers as due by 30 June 2029.

==== Uzory ====
Uzory Club House is a Capital Group residential development under construction on 2nd Vrazhsky Lane in Moscow, designed by ATRIUM. EISZhS lists OOO SZ Vrazhsky as its registered developer under project declaration No. 77-003219. A registry check dated 3 October 2026 gave the fourth quarter of 2028 as the planned commissioning date.

==== MASTERS ====
MASTERS Luxury residential development is a project by Capital Group on Viktorenko Street, designed by GAFA. Its registered project developer is AO SZ Masters. In April 2026, Capital Group announced that construction had entered its active phase. In October 2026, EISZhS listed the fourth quarter of 2029 as the planned commissioning date for object 70548.

=== Completion of other developers' projects ===
In 2017, Moscow's construction investment committee, Moskomstroyinvest, brought in Capital Group on behalf of the city government to help complete stalled housing developments. Capital Group was appointed technical customer for the unfinished Marino Grad, Sportivny Kvartal and Sport Town housing developments in New Moscow, with responsibility for overseeing their completion. All 15 buildings in Sportivny Kvartal had been completed by the end of 2020. The final buildings of Marino Grad and Sport Town were commissioned in 2021.

In 2019, Capital Group became the technical customer for Sky House. Its original developer, Olter, was declared bankrupt in November 2019. The last residential building was commissioned in December 2022.

In 2024, Capital Group was appointed to oversee the completion of three stalled Moscow developments by Seven Suns Development. V stremlenii k svetu was commissioned in December 2024, and Skazochny Les in May 2026.

== Rankings and awards ==
=== Rankings ===
In 2021, Forbes placed Capital Group first in the luxury-housing category of its Russian developer ranking, based on sales in 2020 and the first half of 2021.

The table below shows Capital Group's subsequent positions in the premium-housing category of the magazine's developer-confidence ranking. The ranking takes into account several measures of developers' activity, including sales and project portfolios.

Capital Group in the Forbes developer-confidence ranking: premium housing
Year	Place	Source
2022	2nd	
2023	4th	
2024	2nd	
2025	4th	

=== Company awards and nominations ===
Company awards and nominations
Year	Recipient	Award	Result or category	Source
2009	Capital Group	Kompaniya magazine's Company of the Year awards	Developer of the Year award.	
2009	Capital Group	Euromoney real-estate survey	Named "Best Russian Developer", according to a company announcement published in RBC's Company News section.	
2012	Capital Group	CRE Moscow Awards	Winner, Developer of the Year.	
2012	Capital Group	Euromoney real-estate survey	Named "Best Russian Developer", according to a joint press release by Capital Group and Morgans Hotel Group.	
2013	Capital Group	CRE Moscow Awards	Special title, Developer of the Decade.	
2013	Capital Group	Urban Awards	Winner, Developer of the Year; the ceremony took place on 26 November 2013.	
2021	Capital Group	denkmal awards	Winner in the category for restoration integrated into a residential development, for the Zolotoy residential quarter.	
2023	Capital Group	CRE Awards	According to Capital Group, recognition for its contribution to commercial property development over 2003–2022, which it described as "Key Developer of the Past 20 Years".	
2024	Capital Group	Construction, Infrastructure and Finance awards (National Business Awards)	Recipient in the "Architectural Wonder of the World — 2024" category for the architectural design of the Badaevskiy redevelopment.	
2025	Capital Group	CREDO	Listed by the organisers as the laureate in the category for the best developer of multi-storey housing in Moscow and Moscow Oblast.	
2025	Capital Group	Snob magazine's Made in Russia awards	Nominee in the Business: Creating Value category for its support of the Bibliotheca cultural space.	

At the combined CRE Moscow and CRE All-Russia Awards ceremony in 2020, Capital Group received the Developer of the Year — Commercial Property award.

=== Project awards and nominations ===
In 2016, OKO was a joint winner of the residential high-rise category in the Russian national stage of the FIABCI Prix d'Excellence awards.

Awards and nominations for Capital Group projects
Year	Project and architect	Award	Result and category	References
2019	Badaevskiy redevelopment / Herzog & de Meuron and APEX	World Architecture Festival	Winner: Future Projects – Residential	
2019	Badaevskiy redevelopment / Herzog & de Meuron and APEX	WAFX Award	Winner: Re-use	
2019	Badaevskiy redevelopment / Herzog & de Meuron and APEX	World Architecture Festival	Highly Commended: Future Projects – Masterplanning	
2019	Medny 3.14 / Sergey Skuratov Architects	Moscow Architectural Award	Winner: Best Architectural and Urban Planning Design for a Residential Development	
2020	Kutuzovsky 12 / Tsimailo Lyashenko and Partners	Moscow Architectural Award	Shortlisted, according to the architect's project record	
2021	Kutuzovsky 12 / Tsimailo Lyashenko and Partners	Project Russia magazine awards	Honorary diploma: Housing, according to Capital Group	
2021	Badaevskiy redevelopment / Herzog & de Meuron	MIPIM Awards	Finalist: Best Futura Project	
2022	Medny 3.14 / Sergey Skuratov Architects	30th Zodchestvo festival	Golden Sign: Completed Buildings – Apartment Buildings	
2022	White Khamovniki / Tsimailo Lyashenko and Partners	Moscow Architectural Award	Shortlisted: Best Architectural and Urban Planning Design for a Commercial Property, according to the architect's project record	
2023	BusinessClub by Capital Group	CRE Moscow Awards	Finalist: Asset Management – Serviced Office	
2024	BusinessClub by Capital Group	CRE Moscow Awards	Finalist: Asset Management – Serviced Office	
2026	Uzory public interiors concept / ATRIUM	9th Archpoint Concept Awards	First place; competition theme: Russian Code in Interior Design	
2026	Uzory architectural design / ATRIUM	Moscow Architectural Award	Finalist: Apartment Buildings	

== Legal disputes and development controversies ==
=== Erick van Egeraat ===
On 17 March 2008, an arbitration in Stockholm awarded architect Erick van Egeraat's practice €516,000 for unpaid fees and additional work on City of Capitals, €1.5 million for lost profits, and 12.5 million roubles for copyright infringement, as well as legal costs. On 10 October 2008, the International Commercial Arbitration Court at the Russian Chamber of Commerce and Industry awarded approximately US$1 million in the separate Barvikha Hills case.

The parties reached a settlement in September 2009. A representative of the architect put the total monetary claims at approximately US$4.3 million, but said the agreed payment was lower and would remain undisclosed. The settlement called for payment in instalments over six months.

A separate dispute arose in 2010 after van Egeraat criticised construction quality at City of Capitals in an interview with Interfax. Capital Group sued to protect its business reputation. On 11 January 2011, the Moscow Arbitration Court discontinued the proceedings following a settlement. Van Egeraat said that the Russian translation had changed the meaning of his comments and withdrew the disputed statement.

=== Kolbe house ===
In May 2011, Capital Group subsidiary ADS-424 demolished the remaining facade of the early-twentieth-century Kolbe house on Bolshaya Yakimanka Street, despite orders suspending work and protests by the preservation movement Archnadzor. Capital Group said the facade could not safely be retained and proposed a replacement reflecting the building's appearance. In a 2016 interview, Moscow mayor Sergey Sobyanin said the developer had faced fines and had been required by the city to reproduce the facade. He described the resulting building as a replica.

=== Zhivopisnaya Street ===
In July 2015, Capital Group obtained an urban development plan for a land plot at 21 Zhivopisnaya Street. Less than two weeks later, the rights and obligations under the site's lease were transferred to Stroitel LLC. Stroitel, part of the Kortros group, received the construction permit on 31 May 2016.

Residents and environmental campaigners later protested against the development being carried out by Stroitel. They raised concerns about its effect on the nearby Moskvoretsky park, access routes and the absence of public hearings. Radio Liberty reported a statement by the residents' campaign group saying that, in November 2016, the Presidential Council for Civil Society and Human Rights had asked Moscow mayor Sergey Sobyanin to examine reports of legal violations at the site. The development, named Dom Serebryany Bor, received its commissioning permit in December 2018.

=== Pavel Tio investigation in Kyrgyzstan ===
In March 2024, Kyrgyzstan's State Committee for National Security announced an arrest warrant for Capital Group chairman Pavel Tio, alleging that he had financed the criminal group associated with Kamchy Kolbayev. Later that month, the committee announced that the charges had been withdrawn and the proceedings discontinued, stating that its investigation had found no involvement by Tio in the group's activities.
