= Vladislav Doronin =

Russian businessman

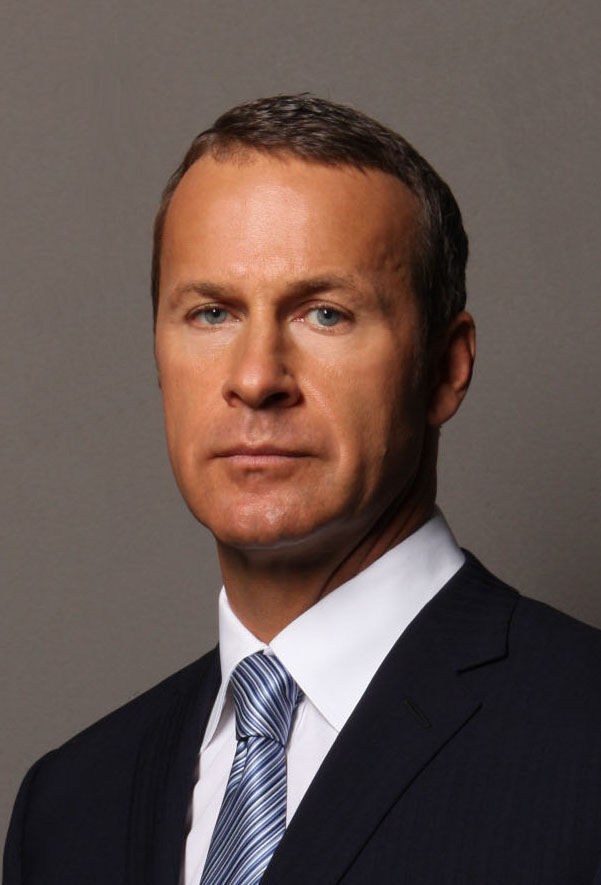
- Born: 7 November 1962 (age 64); Leningrad, Russian SFSR, Soviet Union
- Other name: Vlad Doronin
- Citizenship: Soviet Union (until 1986); Sweden
- Education: Moscow Lomonosov State University
- Occupations: Co-founder of Capital Group; Owner, chairman and CEO of Aman; Chairman and CEO of OKO Group
- Spouse: Ekaterina Doronina
- Partner: Kristina Romanova (2015–present)
- Website: www.vladislavdoronin.com

Vladislav Yurievich Doronin (Russian: Владислав Юрьевич Доро́нин; born 7 November 1962) is a Russian billionaire.

He cofounded Moscow-based Capital Group in 1991 to make his initial fortune. He later founded Miami real estate development company OKO Group, which he is chairman and CEO of, and has been the owner and chairman of Aman Resorts after ousting its founder in 2014.

He has been nicknamed "the Russian James Bond". He has also been called the "Moscow Trump".

== Early life and education ==
Vladislav Doronin was born on 7 November 1962 in Leningrad, Russian Soviet Federative Socialist Republic (now Saint Petersburg, Russia) in a Russian family of Yuri Grigoryevich Doronin (born 15 September 1937) and Zinaida Mikhailovna Doronina (born 2 October 1935). He graduated from the Moscow Lomonosov State University.

== Career ==
=== Marc Rich + Co ===
In 1985 he relocated to Geneva and then to Zug, Switzerland, where he worked under Marc Rich. In his twenties, Doronin also worked in Hong Kong trading commodities in the late 80s and early 90s.

=== Capital Group ===
Doronin founded Capital Group in Moscow in 1991. Initially the firm was engaged in metals and oil trading with Marc Rich. Subsequently the firm entered the Moscow commercial real estate market with class A offices and retail projects, and later expanded with other residential developments. Doronin's equal partners in Capital Group from the early 90s were Pavel Tio and Eduard Berman.

Doronin met his two partners, who at the time lived in the Republic of Uzbekistan, through business when he still worked for Marc Rich, and in 1993 they became shareholders in Capital Group. From the moment of Capital Group's inception until 2004, Marc Rich was one of the firm's investors and financed the acquisition of new assets and their development.

In 2009 Doronin's Capital Group built the City of Capitals mixed-use (office and residential) complex in Moscow City, which consisted of two highrise towers and until 2011 was the highest building in Russia. The complex was designed by Erick van Egeraat.

On 31 December 2010 Vladimir Putin in his decree N2502-p awarded Vladislav Doronin with a Certificate of Merit of the Government of Russian Federation and expressed to him the gratitude of the Government of the Russian Federation. Also in 2010, Doronin won "Businessman of the Year" award in Russia. The award ceremony took place on 25 February 2010 in the Moscow Kremlin.

In 2013 Doronin's Capital Group formed a joint venture with Gavriil Yushvaev, a Russian entrepreneur, for the construction of OKO — a mixed-use (commercial and residential) highrise development in the Moscow International Business Center. In 2016, 55,000 m^{2} (590,000 sq ft) of office space in the OKO development was sold to the Government of Moscow.

For his contributions to the Russian Orthodox Church, Doronin was granted a 1st grade order some time before 2018 by Patriarch Alexy II, Patriarch of Moscow and all Rus, the primate of the Russian Orthodox Church.

In March 2022 Doronin sued The Real Deal for defamation. The suit was filed after the magazine published articles about pro-Ukrainian protests near one of his hotels in Manhattan. Doronin demanded $20 million in damages and claimed that the articles falsely stated that he was Russian and implied that he supported the Putin regime. In April 2022 Doronin filed a defamation lawsuit Swift Communications, a holding company which owns The Aspen Times, after the newspaper published opinion pieces and a letter to the editor that implied Doronin was using his Aspen investment to launder tainted money from Russia. Doronin asked for punitive damages to be imposed on Swift Communications, claiming that The Aspen Times "has chosen to … sensationalize a false narrative that targets Mr. Doronin simply because he was born in what is today Russia".

Until April 2022, he held a 33% stake in Capital Group valued at US$74.5 million. He transferred the ownership in the company to his mother on 14 April, one day after he filed his lawsuit against The Aspen Times. According to Doronin's court filings, he earned his wealth legitimately and is not considered a Russian oligarch, because "oligarchs are not merely wealthy individuals of Russian origin; they are individuals who have amassed their wealth through the exploitation of Russian natural resources, corrupt direction of Russian state-owned enterprises, and close political affiliation with Vladimir Putin." This description, the suit argued, does not fit Doronin.

During the pendency of the suit, coverage of Doronin was suspended by the publisher. Tension over the matter resulted in firing of the editor, Andrew Travers. The legal action was settled by confidential agreement and dismissed on 27 May 2022.

=== Aman Resorts ===
Doronin led a group of investors to buy out luxury hospitality company Aman Resorts in 2014. In doing so, Doronin became involved in an ownership dispute with Omar Amanat and Aman's founder, Adrian Zecha. Amanat had partnered with both Zecha and Doronin to buy Aman, and had been expected to contribute $10 million for a jointly-funded deposit. In early January, Doronin received a financial statement showing the money was from Zecha instead. The partnership then fell apart: in April, Zecha announced his resignation as CEO and chairman ahead of a scheduled end-of-July departure, and Doronin took over as CEO. A week later, Zecha was locked out of his office and was also removed from his Aman-owned home, after which he and Amanat claimed ownership of the company. By July, the dispute had escalated into legal matters, with a London High Court temporarily reinstating Zecha, and Doronin suing Amanat in New York City and alleging fraud.

Johan Eliasch, president of International Ski and Snowboard Federation (FIS), was an investor in Aman Resorts since 2014, loaning the company 25 million dollars and investing another 25 million. In 2014–18 Eliasch was chair of Aman's board of directors and held a 14% stake in the company. FIS chose Aspen for the Men's World Cup skiing races in May 2022, two months after Doronin's acquisition of a prime land lot in Aspen and 8 months after the election of Eliasch as president of FIS.

Doronin partnered with Michael Shvo in 2015 to buy floors 4 through 24 of the Crown Building in New York for about $500 million as an Aman development project. Following the purchase he redeveloped the building to include 83 hotel rooms and 22 apartments within the tower, Infrastructural facilities, a three-story 2,000 m^{2} (22,000 sq ft) spa, a jazz club, a cigar bar and restaurants.

In March 2016, the High Court in London confirmed a settlement reached between Doronin and the liquidators of an Amanat-founded company, recognizing Doronin's full acquisition of Aman Resorts. Amanat was later convicted in 2017 by the federal court of wire fraud and conspiracy and sentenced to five years in prison.

In March 2019 Nader Tavakoli, an investor, filed a lawsuit against Doronin related to the acquisition of Aman Resorts. Tavakoli claimed that he brokered the acquisition and was promised equity interest, but was intentionally cut out of the venture by Doronin and his business partner Carl Johan Eliasch. Doronin's motion to dismiss the case for lack of personal jurisdiction was defeated.

In early 2021 Doronin announced the opening of the hotel and condominium development in the Crown Building, Aman New York, which opened to the public in August 2022. It was reported that a nightly cost of a base-level suite starts at $3,200, while its private club has a $200,000 initiation fee. Doronin also purchased the Aman New York's penthouse for himself in 2024.

In January 2022 Doronin announced a contract with Italy's T.Mariotti shipyard to build a luxury yacht and cruise ship. The project is a joint venture between Aman and Cruise Saudi. The ship, called Amangati, is scheduled to launch in 2027.

In August 2022 Doronin announced the Aman Group's release of a collection of leather goods, including passport cases, bags and wallets. CEO of Aman Essentials Kristina Romanova worked on the designs of the collection. The company announced it would offer private jet tours of Aman hotel and resort locations in March 2023 including stops in Japan, India, Thailand, Bhutan, Turkey, and Greece. Another tour in April 2023 would span from Japan to Morocco. A third is planned in only Japan using high-speed train and helicopter trips.

In 2023, a Bombardier business jet with the tail number 9H-AMN was grounded due to sanctions that OFAC placed on Malta- and Russia-based Emperor Aviation Ltd. This was because it coordinated luxury travel for relatives of Suleyman Kerimov, who is a member of Russia's parliament. Emperor Aviation also operated this Bombardier business jet, which was owned by Aman Resorts and Vlad Doronin and registered in Malta. Neither Doronin nor Aman Resorts were subjected to sanctions themselves. On 3 May 2024, the US Department of the Treasury's OFAC lifted the sanctions on the aircraft 9H-AMN, along with several other jets linked to Malta's Emperor Aviation.

=== OKO Group ===
Doronin's real estate development company OKO Group announced in March 2016 a luxury residential development of a 649-foot, 57-story tower, Missoni Baia, in collaboration with Italian fashion house Missoni. At 1,160 feet (350 m) high, OKO Tower in central Moscow is Europe's tallest completed skyscraper as of April 2016.

In 2020 with Doronin as chairman and CEO, OKO Group had partnered with Cain and began construction on a 57-story office tower at 830 Brickell, Miami, the first office skyscraper built there in over a decade. A second partnership between OKO Group and Cain in Miami took place with the development of a 47-story residential tower called Una on the Brickell Waterfront.

Under Doronin, in March 2022 OKO bought nearly one acre of land on Aspen Mountain's underdeveloped west side for 76 million dollars from Norway Island LLC, a business entity comprising Jim DeFrancia, Bryan Peterson and Jeff Gorsuch, a former U.S. ski team downhill racer and proprietor of a small chain of high-end retail ski shops. The deal generated much controversy in Aspen because eight months earlier, Gorsuch and his partners bought the plot from the Aspen Skiing Company for 10 million dollars. According to Doronin, his long-term plans involve building a luxury hotel property on the site.

In 2022 OKO Group and Cain bought the Edgewater House and The Ambassador Palm Beach Hotel & Residences in Palm Beach for $147 million. Doronin and Cain acquired a $105 million loan from MSD Partners, known as Michael Dell's investment firm.

In July 2022, Doronin announced the OKO group had secured a $97 million construction loan for a new development project in downtown Fort Lauderdale, Florida. The property, a 34-story tower is set to have 251 units and 240 m^{2} (2,600 sq ft). OKO Group announced the project is to be designed by architect Adrian Smith and Gordon Gill, who have previously worked on projects such as the Central Park Tower in Manhattan and the Jeddah Tower in Saudi Arabia.

In 2023 OKO Group was among the major contributors to the campaign of the candidate in the Republican party presidential primaries Francis Suarez, the current mayor of Miami.

=== Janu ===
In March 2020, with Doronin as CEO Aman launched the sister brand of Aman, Janu. Doronin announced that the Janu brand will launch three hotels that are under construction in Montenegro, Saudi Arabia and Tokyo. The first scheduled launch was aimed to be the Tokyo location in 2023.

=== Other ventures ===
Doronin owned the publishing rights in Germany and Russia to Interview magazine.

In March 2022 the Moscow Arbitration Court ordered OOO Ballini, a real estate management firm founded by Doronin, into bankruptcy procedures.

== Art collection ==
Doronin collects artworks by avant-garde artists (Kazimir Malevich and El Lissitzky) and contemporary artists such as Jean-Michel Basquiat, Anish Kapoor, Ed Ruscha, Richard Prince, Urs Fisher, Frank Stella, Julian Schnabel. In 2009, he started the Capital Group Art Foundation.

Doronin has close ties among the art community: artists, gallerists and dealers. He has become friends with some of them. Doronin's friends includes Tony Shafrazi, a New York gallery owner and dealer, who taught him about contemporary art and the late actor and photographer Dennis Hopper.

== Personal life ==
Doronin was married to Ekaterina Moulari for over 20 years, though they have been separated for at least a decade as of 2012. According to British Vogue, Moulari was quoted as saying that the couple were still married as of 2011. Doronin was in a relationship with English supermodel Naomi Campbell from 2008 until 2013. Following their breakup, Doronin sued Campbell.

He has been in a relationship with Kristina Romanova since 2015.

Born in the Soviet Union, he renounced his Soviet citizenship in 1986. He has since become a Swedish citizen. He is a resident of Switzerland, has a home in Miami, Florida, US, and owns an apartment in One Hyde Park, London, UK. In October 2021 the High Court of Justice of the Balearic Islands dismissed the appeal from Doronin against the 2019 ruling, which ordered him to demolish the works carried out illegally in 2014 at his mansion in a forested area on protected rustic land in Ibiza. The illegal construction was located in Platges de Comte by the Nature Protection Service of Spain's Civil Guard in 2014 but the case dragged on for several years. The High Court's ruling ordered Doronin to pay a fine of 1 million euros to Sant Josep City Council and triggered another legal case evaluating the seriousness of the urban infraction committed by Doronin. It was decided that illegal works are to be demolished by Doronin and, if he fails to do so, by the Sant Josep Town Hall.

In a 2016 interview with Forbes, Doronin said that he frequently travels to Moscow where he owns a business and to visit friends. In 2018, Doronin finished building Capital Hill Residence, his private residence in Barvikha, a prestigious neighborhood outside of Moscow. The property, designed by Zaha Hadid, has 3,300 m^{2} (36,000 sq ft) of space and includes a swimming pool, spa and a library and was estimated to have a market value of $140 million. He sold the property in 2022.

=== Relations with Jeffrey Epstein ===
Vladislav Doronin was one of the Russian elites named in the Epstein Files. He assisted Jeffrey Epstein in obtaining a Russian visa in 2010 after he invited Epstein to Moscow, Russia in 2009.
