= Vadym Skuratov =

Ukrainian water polo player

Personal information
- Nationality: Ukrainian
- Born: 27 February 1967 (age 58); Kyiv, Ukrainian SSR, Soviet Union

Sport
- Sport: Water polo

Vadym Skuratov (born 27 February 1967) is a Ukrainian water polo player. He competed in the men's tournament at the 1996 Summer Olympics.
