= Pavel Tio =

Russian businessman

- Born: 20 May 1963 (age 63); Tashkent, Uzbekistan, Soviet Union)
- Other name: Pavel Tyo
- Citizenship: Soviet Union (1962–1991); Russian Federation; South Korea
- Education: Tashkent Polytechnic Institute
- Occupation: Co-founder of Capital Group
- Spouse: Olga Karput

Pavel Tio (born 20 May 1963, Tashkent) is a Russian entrepreneur, chairman of the board of directors and co-owner of the Russian development company Capital Group.

== Business career ==
Pavel Tyo was born on 20 May 1963, in Tashkent, Uzbekistan into a family of power engineers. In 1985, he graduated from Tashkent Polytechnic Institute, specializing in thermal power plants. He was then employed at Uzbekhydroproject as a thermal power engineer.

In 2016, he headed the commission on high-rise construction of the Public Council under the Ministry of Construction of the Russian Federation.

=== Capital Group ===
In the early 1990s he was engaged in trading, and in 1993 he became a shareholder of the construction company Capital Group. By 2016, he had become chairman of the Board of Directors, and as of 2022 he was the majority owner of the company.

==== Capital Pharmacies ====
Pavel Tyo was in 2017 the owner of Stolichniye Apteki, a chain of pharmacies.

== Scandals ==
In 2015, Pavel Tyo was suspected of killing a snow leopard in Kyrgyzstan, and the Ministry of Natural Resources sent a request to check information from social networks to the General Prosecutor's Office. According to the K-News agency, the Kyrgyz authorities did not investigate the case.

On 12 March 2024, the State Committee for National Security of Kyrgyzstan reported that it had put Pavel Tyo, a Russian businessman and owner of the Capital Group company, on the wanted list on suspicion of financing the Kamchy Kolbayev organized crime group.

== Personal life ==
Pavel Tyo's paternal grandfather, Korean writer Cho Men-hee (1894–1938), by the decision of the troika was sentenced to execution on charges of betrayal of the interests of the Soviet people and espionage in favor of Japan on 15 April 1938. He was executed 11 May.

Pavel Tyo is married to Olga Karput, owner of KM20 boutique. They have six children.
