= Patricia Conway (architect) =

American architect

Patricia Conway is an American urban planner, architect, and designer. She is a former partner at the architecture firm Kohn Pedersen Fox, where she was one of the early partners, joining founding partners Gene Kohn, Bill Pedersen and Shelley Fox. She led the offshoot interiors division, Kohn Pedersen Fox Conway. She later became Dean of the Department of Architecture at the University of Pennsylvania.

== Education ==
Conway received her B.A. in English Literature at New York University, and later received her M.A. At Columbia University in New York, she received her M.S. in Urban Planning. She was a Loeb Fellow at Harvard University for Graduate School of Design from 1986-1987. She was the first woman dean of an Ivy League design school at the University of Pennsylvania, Graduate School of Fine Arts, from 1991-94.

== Career ==
Patricia Conway was an early partner at Kohn Pedersen Fox which became one of the most influential architecture firms in the 1980s. It was founded in New York City in 1976. Initially embracing architectural postmodernism, in short order KPF became a competitor to the world’s largest architectural firm, Skidmore, Owings, and Merrill. Shortly after KPF was established, the American Broadcasting Company (ABC) chose them to redesign an armory building into a TV studio and office building in Manhattan’s West Side. They continued to do more 14 more projects for ABC, which led to KPF becoming a world class architecture firm. Conway was a Partner of the Manhattan architectural firm. Started her career as a journalist, first for a trade publication on architectural glass, then as a freelance writer for The Washington Post. I am m not a designer, not an architect, but an urban planner, she said.

== Awards ==
Conway received the Designer of the Year Award from Interiors Magazine in 1987. She received the award in New York from her colleagues in the interior design profession.

== Books ==
Conway was an editor for the book Ornamentalism with Robert Jensen (Clarkson N. Potter, 1982). Conway also wrote “Art for Everyday: The New Craft Movement”, published in 1990. Another book she wrote was “The Sex of Architecture”, published in 1996.

== Bibliography ==
- Slesin, Suzanne. “Designer of the Year Points Her Firm to Office Interiors”. The New York Times: New York. 5 Feb. 1987.
- Sennott, R. Stephen. “Encyclopedia of Twentieth Century Architecture”. Fitzroy Dearborn: New York, London. Volume 2: 733. 2004. Print.
- Pedersen, Bill. “Architecture: Bill Pedersen’s Hot Firm Takes on a New Rockefeller Center”. New York Magazine: New York. 11 Sept. 1989.
- Conway, Patricia. “Industrial Design USA: Human Systems”. Design Quarterly: Walker Art Center. 1973. Print.
- “Architecture: Patricia Conway”. PennDesign: University of Pennsylvania School of Design. 2016.
- “Almac”. University of Pennsylvania. Vol. 41, No. 08. 18 Oct. 1994.
