= Beijing Capital Group =

Chinese real estate company

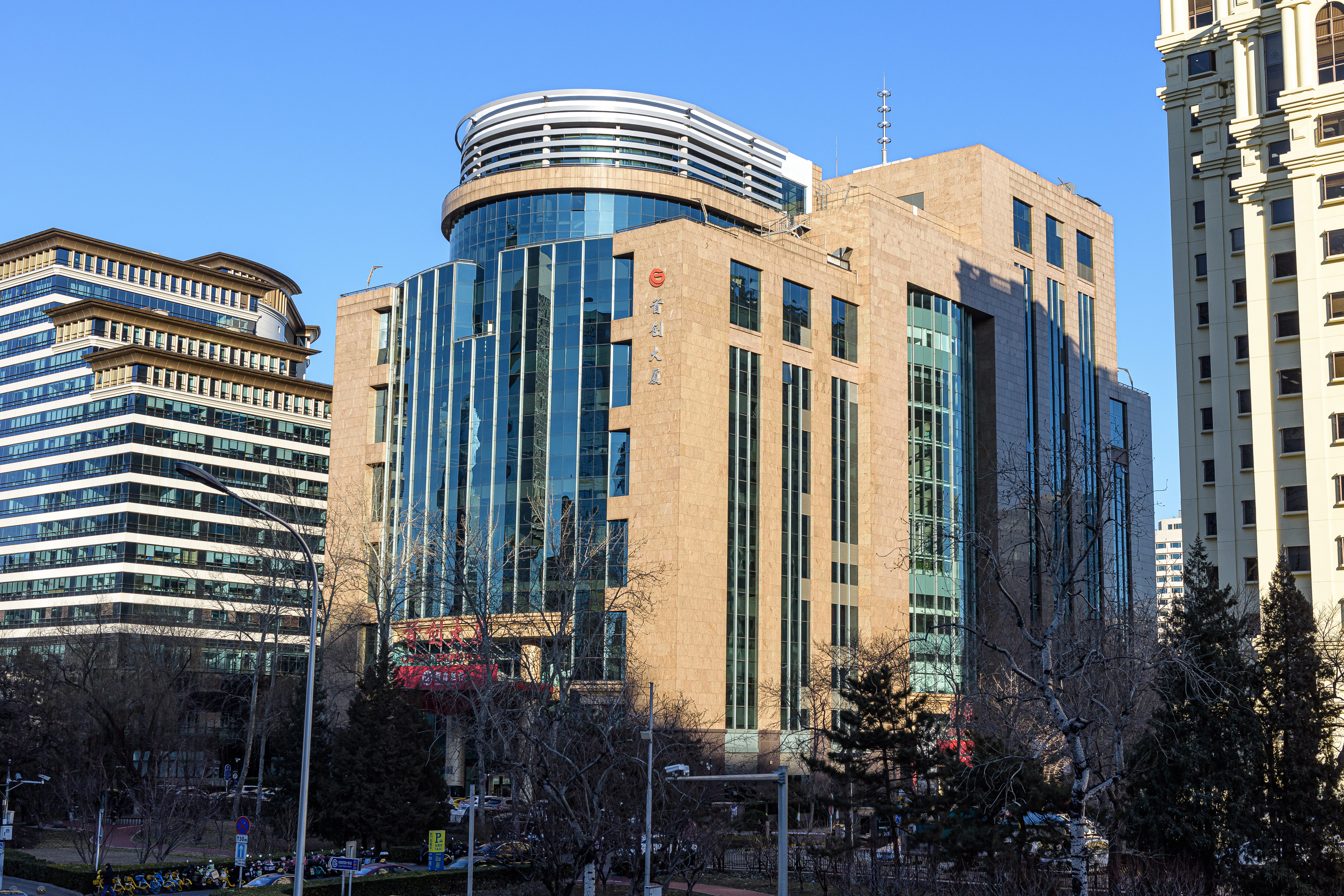
Headquarters

Beijing Capital Group Co., Ltd., also known as BCG or the Capital Group (simplified Chinese: 北京首都创业集团有限公司; pinyin: Běijīng shǒudū chuàngyè jítuán yǒuxiàn gōngsī, abbreviated 北京首创, pinyin Běijīng shǒu chuàng), is a state-owned real estate enterprise directly under the supervision of the State-owned Assets Supervision and Administration Commission of the Beijing Municipality (Beijing SASAC). The Beijing Capital Group Co. was incorporated in 1994 and is primarily a real estate firm. Headquartered in Beijing, BCG has a business network covering China as well as overseas markets, five listed subsidiaries, and total assets of over RMB 180 billion (US$30 billion).

== Core businesses ==
The Beijing Capital Group has four core businesses:

- Environmental protection, including water, solid waste, air pollution, and environmental technology. The key water subsidiary is Beijing Capital Co., Ltd, founded in 1999 and listed in 2000 (stock code: 600008). In 2011, the Group's Capital Environment Holdings Ltd. subsidiary entered the solid waste disposal sector by acquiring the New Environmental Energy Holdings Ltd. (03989.HK), which was subsequently renamed Capital Environment Holdings Ltd.
- Infrastructure, including road, rail, and subways. Beijing Capital Group is a major investor in the Beijing Subway in a joint venture partnership with the Hong Kong MTR.
- Real estate: Beijing Capital Land Ltd. (BCL) is the flagship company in the Group's real estate business, and is listed on the Hong Kong Stock Exchange (stock code: HK2868).
- Financial services/funds, including the Beijing Agricultural Investment Co., Ltd, set up in 2008.

== Overseas investment ==
=== France ===
The Sino-EU Economic and Trade Cooperation Zone, built by BCG in 2012 in Châteauroux, France, was the first large-scale comprehensive industrial park in a developed country established and operated by a Chinese enterprise.

Despite these 2012 announcements, in 2020 the investments were not finalized, and the forecasted industrial park was no longer planned to be set-up in operation.

=== New Zealand ===
The Beijing Capital Group acquired Trans-Pacific Industries (TPI) in New Zealand in June 2014 for NZ$950 million and set up the Beijing Capital Waste Management NZ Ltd (BCWM NZ). Regulatory approval was received from the New Zealand Government's Overseas Investment Office (OIO) in October 2013. In the New Zealand solid waste disposal sector, BCWM NZ has the largest market share, at 31 percent. As of December 2015 BCG's investment in BCWM NZ is the single largest Chinese direct investment in New Zealand. In line with its application for Overseas Investment Office approval, Beijing Capital Group announced it would invest NZ$98 million in BCWM NZ to buy new assets, develop landfill capacity, and introduce new anaerobic digestion technology at the Redvale landfill in Auckland.
