= Sergey Skuratov =

Soviet airline pilot and Russian entrepreneur (born 1950)

Sergey Nikolaevich Skuratov
- Born: March 31, 1950 (age 76); Sverdlovsk, RSFSR, Soviet Union
- Occupation: General Director of Ural Airlines
- Parents: Nikolai Sergeevich Skuratov (father); Nina Filippovna Skuratova (mother)

Sergey Nikolaevich Skuratov (born March 31, 1950) was the General Director and controlling owner of Ural Airlines from 1993 to 2024. He holds the title of Distinguished Transportation Worker of the Russian Federation.

== Biography ==
Skuratov was born on March 31, 1950, in Sverdlovsk.

He studied at Sverdlovsk school No. 92, from which he graduated in 1967.

In 1967 he entered Buguruslan flying school, which he graduated with honors in 1970.

His first job was with the Second Sverdlovsk United Air Squadron as a co-pilot on the AN-2 airplane. In 1972 he was appointed commander of the AN-2 and received the 3rd class of civil aviation pilot.

In 1978 he graduated from the Civil Aviation Academy with honors as a pilot engineer. From 1975 he worked in the Sverdlovsk Air Detachment. Sergey Skuratov flew more than 10,000 hours as a pilot.

In 1984 he graduated from the academy's command faculty. He took the position of head of the Flight Safety Inspection of the Ural Civil Aviation Administration.

In 1987 he became the commander of the Sverdlovsk United Air Detachment (in 1991 - transformed into the First Sverdlovsk State Aviation Enterprise).

In the wake of perestroika, the aviation industry was experiencing a crisis: airlines in Perm, Chelyabinsk, Kirov, Tomsk, Vladivostok and other cities disappeared. In 1993 the First Sverdlovsk State Aviation Enterprise was split into two joint-stock companies: Ural Airlines and Koltsovo Airport. Skuratov became the head of Ural Airlines. The company's position was complicated by the fact that Europe had banned flights on Tu-154B and Il-86 aircraft, which formed the backbone of the fleet. In order to continue flying abroad, Sergei Skuratov attracted investors and the government of the Sverdlovsk region to purchase three Tu-154M airliners.

From 1998 to 2004 he was chairman of the board of the Association of Air Transport Operators of the Russian Federation.

Since July 1998 he has been chairman of the Urals Regional Branch of the International Association of Airline Managers (IARAP), and is a member of the association's council.

Under Skuratov's leadership, Ural Airlines became a steadily growing airline by the early 2000s. The geography of flights included 46 cities in Russia, CIS and non-CIS countries. The air fleet included 24 aircraft, including 4 IL-86s, 13 Tu-154Bs and 4 Tu-154M, 3 AN-24s.

In 2006 the re-equipment of the company's fleet took place, headed by Sergey Skuratov. An-24, Tu-154 and Il-86 were replaced by Airbus. The transition to the new type of equipment required special training, which was also organized by Skuratov. On Skuratov's initiative, an Airbus neo was added to the company's fleet, making Ural Airlines the first Russian airline to have airplanes with such engines. The airline currently leases 51 Airbus aircraft in its fleet.

The air carrier's own training center was opened at Ural Airlines in 2012. Sergey Skuratov, being qualified as a pilot-instructor on various types of aircraft, initiated it. By 2024, the company had retrained more than 400 pilots, 117 aircraft commanders, and 60 instructor pilots.

Following Skuratov's decision, the Aviation Technical Center was founded. This allowed the company to perform full aircraft maintenance and repair. In May 2014, construction of a maintenance complex for wide-body aircraft, such as Airbus A330 and Boeing 767, was completed at Koltsovo Airport.

He also launched a digitalization program, which he then oversaw.

By 2013, he owned 80.22% of Ural Airlines shares.

By mid-2024, the company under Skuratov's leadership was among the top 5 in the industry. The total number of routes was 169~~.~~ According to data for the first half of 2024, every 12th Russian passenger flew Ural Airlines.

In August 2024 Sergey Skuratov resigned as CEO of Ural Airlines in favor of his son Kirill.

Skuratov is a Member of the board of trustees of the Sverdlovsk State Children's Philharmonic in Yekaterinburg.

== Awards, titles, ratings ==
He has been honored numerous times for his achievements:

- 1987 – Badge of honor "Excellent Aeroflot Employee"
- 1996 – Honored Transport Worker of the Russian Federation
- 2003 – Order of Honour
- 2001 – Diploma "Contest Expert" of the First Open National Contest "Civil Aviation Manager of the Year of Russia" (2001, MARAP prize)
- 2002–2003 – Winner (gold laureate) of the Second Open National Contest "Russian Civil Aviation Manager of the Year" (2002–2003, MARAP prize) in the nomination "Elder of the Russian Civil Aviation Director Corps"
- 2003, 2010 – Certificate of Merit from the governor of the Sverdlovsk Region
- 2010 – Certificate of Merit of the Ministry of Transport of the Russian Federation
- 2011 – Order of Friendship – for labor achievements and many years of conscientious work
- 2017 – Honorary Citizen of the Sverdlovsk Region
- 2018 – Honorary Citizen of Ekaterinburg
- 2018 – "Person of the Year" according to Delovoy Kvartal magazine
- 2020 – Order of Merit to the Fatherland, IV degree – for labor achievements and many years of conscientious work
- 2021 – 22nd place in the rating "Ekaterinburg's Big 100"
- 2021-2022 – 31st place in the TOP-100 influential people of the Sverdlovsk region according to "Business Magazine. Ural"
- 2023 – Jubilee Medal "100 Years of Russian Civil Aviation" – for great labor and responsible approach to work...

== Personal life ==
His father, Nikolai Sergeevich Skuratov, was an employee of the airline, flew as a flight mechanic on Il-18. His mother, Nina Filippovna Skuratova, was a shift supervisor of Koltsovsky air terminal.

He has two older brothers - Oleg and Nicholas. He is married and has a son. Four granddaughters.

He is fond of tennis, skiing, and golf.

He won the title of champion in the first Sverdlovsk Region Open Golf Championship in 2012.

He collects stamps.
