= William Lauw-Zecha =

Indonesian plantation owner and businessman (1899-1983)

Aristide William Lauw-Zecha
- Born: 1899; Sukabumi, Dutch East Indies
- Died: 1983 (aged 83–84); Kuala Lumpur, Malaysia
- Occupations: Plantation owner, businessman
- Known for: The first Indonesian to graduate from an American university
- Spouse: Lim Kim See
- Children: Andrew Lauw-Zecha; Allen Lauw-Zecha; Adrian Lauw-Zecha; Alwin Lauw-Zecha; Austen Lauw-Zecha
- Father: Louis Tjeng Bie Lauw-Zecha
- Relatives: Lauw Tek Lok, Luitenant der Chinezen (paternal grandfather); Louisa Zecha (paternal grandmother); Sim Keng Koen, Kapitein der Chinezen (step-grandfather); Lauw Ho (paternal great-grandfather); Michelle Saram (granddaughter-in-law)

Aristide William Lauw-Zecha (1899-1983), usually known as William Lauw-Zecha, was an Indonesian plantation owner, businessman; and – as an alumnus of the class of 1923 of Iowa University – he was the first Indonesian to graduate from an American university. He belonged to the Lauw-Sim-Zecha family, part of the 'Cabang Atas' gentry of the Dutch East Indies (now Indonesia), and is the father of the hotelier Adrian Lauw-Zecha, founder of Aman Resorts.

== Biography ==
Born in 1899 in Sukabumi, a hill station in the Preanger highlands of West Java, Lauw-Zecha was the son of Louis Tjeng Bie Lauw-Zecha, and a grandson of the landlord and bureaucrat Lauw Tek Lok, Luitenant der Chinezen of Bekasi by his Indo-Bohemian wife, Louisa Zecha. Lauw-Zecha's step-grandfather was Sim Keng Koen, the first Kapitein der Chinezen of Sukabumi. The posts of Kapitein and Luitenant der Chinezen were high-ranking civil government positions in the Dutch colonial bureaucracy.

The Lauw-Sim-Zecha family held landed estates (particuliere landen) and plantations around Batavia and Sukabumi, and lived in a grand manner as Sukabumi's premier Chinese gentry family. Lauw-Zecha's own father, Louis, was the sole owner of the Soekaboemische Snelpersdrukkery, an office equipment and printing establishment, and had interests in tea and rice plantations, as well as export and import, including automobiles. From 1911 onwards, Louis Lauw-Zecha also became the official distributor of Parker Pens, an American pen manufacturer, in the Dutch East Indies. In 1920, Lauw-Zecha's father appointed an American professional, Edwin F. Lee, to act as associate manager of all his commercial interests in the Indies.

This American connection continued when, in the late 1910s, William Lauw-Zecha attended Iowa University and, graduating in 1923, became the first Indonesian to acquire an American university degree. During his time there, he was active in the Chinese Students' Alliance of Eastern States, U. S. A., and was elected as its executive councillor. Upon returning to the Indies, Lauw-Zecha helped manage the family's landholdings, businesses and continued to act as the distributor of Parker Pens.

Lauw-Zecha was married to Lim Kim See, a Malayan Chinese; together, the couple had five sons: Andrew, Allen, Adrian, Alwin and Austen Lauw-Zecha. As parents, the couple prioritised their sons' education, all of whom ended up pursuing their education, like their father, in the United States. Their fourth son Alwin, a Tufts alumnus of 1956, recalled his parents' comments: 'the only promise we are going to give you is that we will do our best to support you through the best formal education program that you each individually wish to pursue. Once you said you've had enough of studies, you are on your own.'

The family's large landholdings and businesses survived the Japanese occupation during World War II and the Indonesian revolution of 1945–1950. In 1956, however, Sukarno, the first President of newly independent Indonesia, nationalised many of the country's private assets, forcing William Lauw-Zecha and many of his relatives to move overseas. Lauw-Zecha settled down in Malaysia, where his wife originated, and died on July 6, 1983, in Kuala Lumpur.
