= Tunku Abdullah =

Malaysian businessman (1925–2008)

Yang Amat Mulia Tan Sri Tunku Abdullah Tuanku Abdul Rahman DKYR PSM PPT
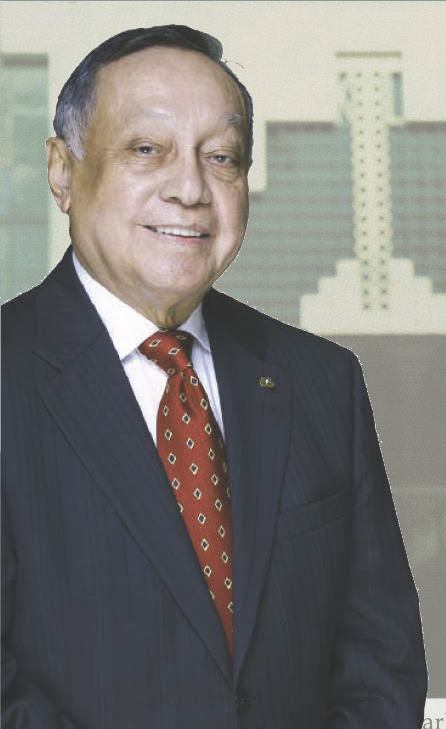

Member of the Malaysian Parliament for Rawang (Parliament suspended 13 May 1969 – 20 February 1971)
- In office 18 May 1964 – 31 July 1974
- Preceded by: Liu Yoong Peng (PRM—SF)
- Succeeded by: Walter Loh Poh Khan (MCA—BN)

Personal details
- Born: Tunku Abdullah ibni Tuanku Abdul Rahman; 2 May 1925 Kuala Pilah, Negeri Sembilan, Federated Malay States (now Malaysia)
- Died: 20 August 2008 (aged 83) Kuala Lumpur International Airport, Sepang, Selangor, Malaysia
- Resting place: Seri Menanti Royal Mausoleum
- Education: University of Glasgow; University of Miyazaki
- Occupation: Businessman; Politician

Tan Sri Tunku Abdullah ibni Almarhum Tuanku Abdul Rahman (2 May 1925 – 20 August 2008) was a notable Malaysian businessman and a founder of the Melewar Group Berhad of companies.

== Early life ==
Tunku Abdullah was born on 2 May 1925 at Kuala Pilah, Negeri Sembilan. His father was Tuanku Abdul Rahman (1895–1960), the Ruler of Negeri Sembilan state (1933–1960) and later appointed at the first King of Malaya (1957–1960). His mother was Che Engku Maimuna née Dulcibella (Dulcie) Campbell, a nurse at the Government Hospital in Kuala Lumpur. Tunku Abdullah was appointed to the state royal-rank of Tunku Panglima Besar in 1963. He was fondly known as "Charlie", as he was a fan of pianist Charlie Kunz.

== Education ==
- Malay College, Kuala Kangsar (Apr 1936)
- Kokusai Gaku Yukai, Tokyo (Jun - Dec 1943)
- Miyazaki Koto Norin Gakko (Dec 1943 - Feb 1945)
- Fukuoka Koto Gakko (Feb - Aug 1945)
- Raffles College, Singapore - Economics Dept (Nov 1946)
- University of Glasgow, Scotland - Diploma in Public Administration (Oct 1948 - May 1951)

During the World War II Japanese occupation of Malaya, each of the Malay royal families were required to send an heir to Japan for training to become part of the empire. Tunku Abdullah was 18 years of age when he arrived in Japan in a group with the other Malay royal heirs. When he was 20 years old, he witnessed the flash of light in the sky from the Hiroshima atomic bomb. With the surrender of Japan in September 1945, Tunku Abdullah became Public Relations Officer for U.S. Sixth Army HQ in Kyoto. On 15 December 1945, he returned by ship to Singapore.

He had completed his graduation from the University of Glasgow and held a diploma in agriculture from Miyazaki University in Japan. Tunku was in the civil service and served for 10 years before getting into politics.

== Public Service career ==
=== Civil Service ===
Tunku Abdullah joined the civil service in many capacities: As Malay Officer to Kuala Lumpur Land & District Office (1955); as Assistant District Officer II in Kuala Selangor (1956); as Deputy Superintendent of Census (1956) for the Federal Secretariat; as Assistant State Secretary (1958) in Kuantan, later as District Officer (1960); as District Officer to Ulu Selangor (1961); as Assistant Secretary (1962) to Ministry of Works, Post and Telecommunications; leaving in 1963.

=== Youth Movement ===
Encouraged by Mubin Sheppard, Tunku Abdullah also joined the Malayan Association of Youth Clubs (MAYC) in 1954 as Honorary Secretary and later became President [1956-1971]; culminating in the completion of Wisma Belia building (on Jalan Syed Putra). He was also President of the Malaysian Youth Council (MYC) [1966-1972] & President of the Asian Youth Council (AYC) [1972-1976]. Under the World Assembly of Youth (WAY), he was a frequent delegate [1964-1972]. For the youth movement, he led many international delegations, missions & seminars: To Japan (1959, 66 & 77); New Delhi (1961); Cairo (1962); Amherst, USA (1964); New Zealand (1965); Netherlands (1967); Vienna (1968); Liege, Belgium (1969); Brussels (1970 & 71); Manchester (1972); and Colombo (1976). In April 1958, Tunku Abdullah arrived in Hawaii as a guest of the State Department of the United States. During this visit, he became good friends with Fuad Donald Stephens of {then} North Borneo {now, Sabah}.

=== Politics ===
Tunku Abdullah was elected as the Member of the Parliament of Malaysia (MP) for the Rawang constituency from 1964 to 1974. During this time, he began his long friendship with the MP seated beside him, Dr Mahathir Mohamad. He is the subject of the books Tunku Abdullah – A Passion for Life and the 20th anniversary version, A Prince Called "Charlie".

== Business career ==
Tunku Abdullah consolidated his business ventures into a conglomerate under the name of "Melewar" Group or Corporation.

In his book Melewar Turns Silver 1963-1988, the Melewar companies mentioned are; Binaan Nasional S/B [1963, construction], Duncan, Gilbey & Matheson [1964, drink industry], Pacific World Travel [1964, travel & tours], Mitra Malaysia [1970, travel agency], Melewar Trading [1974, defence equipment], Pacific Asia Leasing [1974, finance lease & hire purchase], Melewar Clarkson [1975, insurance brokers], Melewar Transport [1975, transport & logistics], M&C Saatchi Malaysia S/B [1976, advertising], Melewar Corporation [1981, investment company], Kompusat [1982, computer retail], Accent Technology [1982, computer assembly], Nishio Lease [1982, equipment leasing], Daniel J Edelman [1984, public relations], Vita Tenggara Fruits Industries [1984, fruit farm], Central Market S/B [1985, shopping centre], Great Value Holidays S/B [1985, travel & tours], Malaysian Assurance Alliance {MAA Group} [1985, insurance], Trace Management Services S/B [1985, company secretarial], Academia S/B [1987, education] -&- Prai Malaysia Wood & Rattan Industries [1987, wood manufacture]. Non-Melewar companies of mention are; MBf Finance Berhad [1968, financial services] -&- Granite Industries Berhad [1987, mining & manufacture]: as well as others : Central Market Japan Co., Ltd.

Beyond 1988, other Melewar companies and foundations include: MasterConsult, MetroVision, Royal Langkawi Yacht Club, Melewar Industrial Group, Mycron Steel, Budimas Charitable Foundation, as well as MAA Medicare Charitable Foundation. Tunku Abdullah also served as Chairman to several companies which include: MBf Holdings, Malayan Cement Berhad, Aokam Tin Berhad, Georgetown Holdings Berhad, Taisho Marine & Fire Insurance (M) S/B, MBf Capital Berhad, PWE Industries Berhad, Nusantara Steel S/B, Toshiba Electronics Malaysia S/B, Gentali Malaysia S/B.

Tunku Abdullah's involvement with the MBf Group was due to his close friendship with Tan Sri Loy Hean Heong.

MasterConsult marketed defence equipment to the government and was sales agent for companies like Rosoboronexport, McDonnell Douglas, ASMAR, Dassault Aviation, Aermacchi, Engesa and Dornier Flugzeugwerke.

Tunku Abdullah was particularly well known for the successful urban re-development of Central Market, Kuala Lumpur, preserving the heritage building {which had been earmarked for demolition}. Other heritage buildings refurbished include Wisma Melewar {now, Wisma Ekran}. He is also known for the development of Royal Langkawi Yacht Club and marina in Kuah, Langkawi.

== Family life ==
He was married six times.

- Tunku Zaharah binti Tunku Zakaria: She was his cousin, an eminent royal person - married 1946 Apr 22, divorced 1959 Mar. They had 3 children:
  - Tunku Dato' Seri Iskandar - b. 1947
  - Tunku Datin Marinah Ashraf - b. 1952
  - Tunku Dato' Kamil Ikram - b. 1954
- Yuzin Ho: A respected health official attached to the Kemaman Medical and Health Office in Terengganu - married 1959 Aug 6, divorced 1966 Mar 30. They had 3 sons:
  - Tunku Dato' Yaacob Khyra - b. 1960
  - Tunku Yahaya - b. 1962
  - Tunku Halim - b. 1964
- Kathryn Heather Barbara Martin: A debutante from New Zealand - married 1966 Mar 30, divorced 1972 Feb 20. They had 1 daughter:
  - Tunku Soraya Dakhlah - b. 1967
- Chesterina Sim-Zecha: An Indonesian-born ballerina, a scion of Lauw-Sim-Zecha family (part of the 'Cabang Atas') - married 1973 Apr 24, divorced 1991 Jan 12.
- Yuko Oshima: A notable Japanese businesswoman - married 1991 Aug 10, divorced 1996 Nov 4.
- Rozeeta Ahmad Baharuddin: A celebrated Malaysian socialite - married 1997 Apr 25. They had a pair of twins:
  - Tunku Intan Kurshiah - b. 2000
  - Tunku Muhammad Shah - b. 2000

== Death ==
Tunku Tan Sri Abdullah died on 20 August 2008 at the Kuala Lumpur International Airport (KLIA) clinic. He was 83 years old. He was buried at the Seri Menanti Royal Mausoleum in Seri Menanti, Negeri Sembilan.

Former Prime Minister, Tun Dr Mahathir Mohamad posted an online obituary for Tunku Abdullah, "Today is a sad day for me. Today I lost a very good friend. Tunku Abdullah was a member of Parliament in 1964 when I first met him. He was a gregarious person and it was easy to become his friend even after knowing him only a short while. He was a very loyal friend too. When I was expelled from UMNO in 1969 he did not stay away from me as many people did. When I came to Kuala Lumpur three days after race riots broke out, he was at the Railway Station waiting for me with his car, despite rumors I was going to be arrested. The police were there in full force. But I was not arrested. I went off to Tunku’s house. I rejoined UMNO through his division in Rawang. But that route was not acceptable to UMNO. He was a man of the people and got on well with his constituency people. At the same time he was close to Tunku Abdul Rahman, the Prime Minister and to Tun Razak. He lived life fully. I do not think we will find people like him any more. I feel much saddened by his passing. I have lost a good and loyal friend. May Allah s.w.t shower his blessing on his soul."

== Honours ==
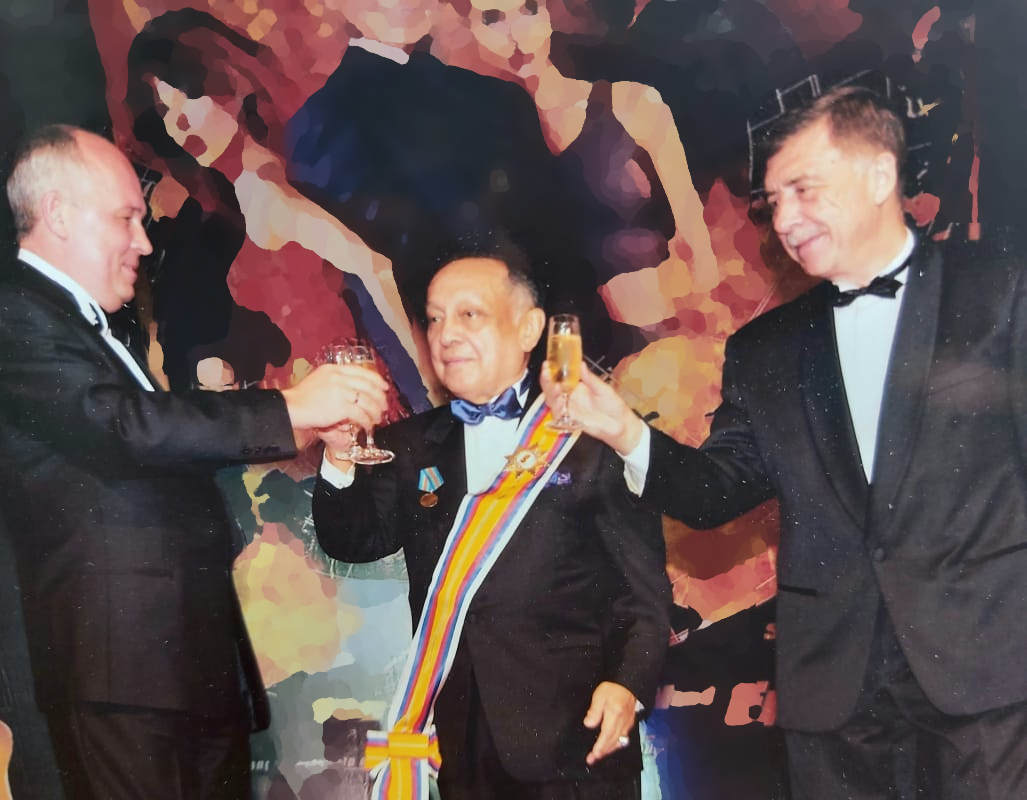
Tunku Abdullah presented the Russian Order of Friendship by Ambassador Chemezov with Director Morozov in 2005

- Malaysia
  - Commander of the Order of Loyalty to the Crown of Malaysia (PSM) – Tan Sri (1999)
- Negeri Sembilan
  - Distinguished Conduct Medal (PPT) (1963)
  - Recipient of the Royal Family Order of Yam Tuan Radin Sunnah (DKYR) (1979)
- Chile
  - Grand Cross of the Order of Bernardo O'Higgins of Chile (1994)
- Russia
  - Order of Friendship of Russian Federation (2005)
