= Pondok Jati railway station =

Railway station in East Jakarta, Indonesia

C01 Pondok Jati Station Stasiun Pondok Jati
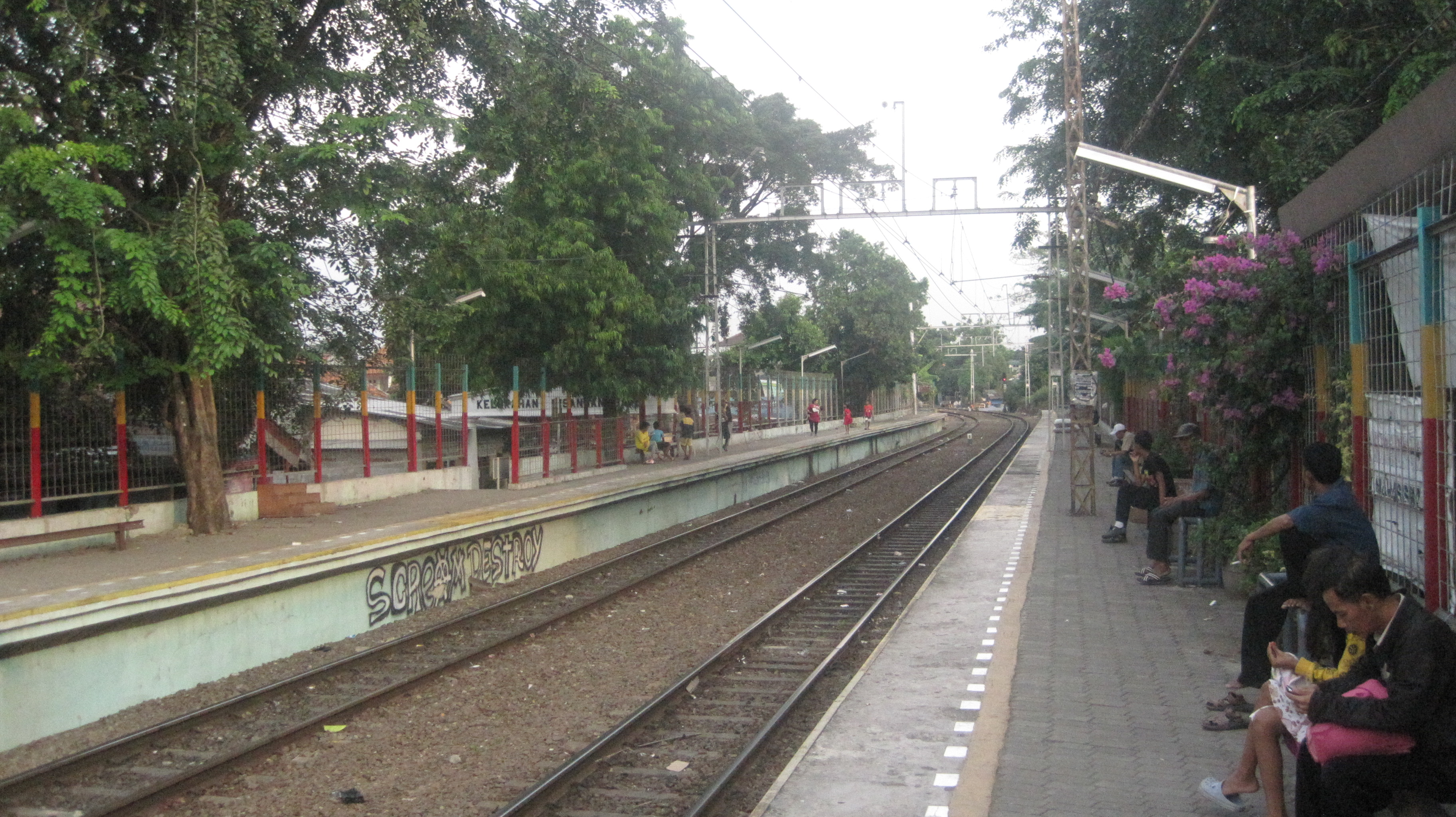
- The tracks and platforms of Pondok Jati station.

General information
- Location: Jl. Bunga No. 2, Palmeriam, Matraman, East Jakarta; Jakarta; Indonesia
- Coordinates: 6.2090°S 106.8623°E
- Elevation: +14 m (46 ft)
- System: Commuter rail station
- Owner: Kereta Api Indonesia
- Operator: Kereta Api Indonesia; KAI Commuter
- Line: Cikarang Loop Line
- Platforms: 2 side platforms
- Tracks: 2

Construction
- Parking: No
- Cycle facilities: No

Other information
- Station code: POK • 0474
- Classification: Class III (Small)

History
- Electrified: 1924

Services
Preceding station		Following station
Kramat towards Kampung Bandan or Jakarta Kota via Pasar Senen	Cikarang Commuter Line	Jatinegara towards Bekasi or Cikarang
Location
- Location within Jakarta

Pondok Jati (POK) is a railway station in Palmeriam, Matraman, East Jakarta, Indonesia. Located on the intracity loop railway that circles Central Jakarta, it currently serves the Cikarang Loop Line of KRL Commuterline only.

The station was originally named Gang Solitude and was a small halt under the management of the Bataviasche Oosterspoorweg Maatschappij. It was renamed Pondok Jati on 1 July 1942, during the Japanese occupation of the Dutch East Indies (present-day Indonesia).

== Station layout ==
The station has two railway tracks and a pair of side platforms, serving trains in both directions.

C01
Platform floor	Side platform, the doors are opened on the right side	
Platform floor	Line 1	← (Kramat) Cikarang Loop Line (counterclockwise loop) towards Kampung Bandan
Platform floor	Line 2	Cikarang Loop Line (clockwise loop) to Cikarang (Jatinegara) →
Platform floor	Side platform, the doors are opened on the right side	

== Services ==
=== Passenger services ===
- KAI Commuter
  - Cikarang Loop Line (Full Racket)
    - Counterclockwise, towards Kampung Bandan, Tanah Abang, and Manggarai
    - Clockwise, towards Jatinegara and Cikarang

== Supporting transportation ==
Type	Route	Destination
Mikrotrans Jak Lingko (Transjakarta)	JAK.86	Terminal Manggarai–Terminal Rawamangun

== Incidents ==
On 19 February 2025, a collision occurred between the KA 302 freight train, a motorcycle, and a Suzuki Carry pickup truck carrying liquefied petroleum gas cylinders at the level crossing located adjacent to the station. This crossing suffers from poor-quality asphalt and congestion. According to the nearby crossing guards, the bar gate had lowered, and the train driver had given a stop signal with a red flag, but the motorcyclist forced through nonetheless, causing the pickup truck to become trapped on the railway tracks.

Preceding station	Kereta Api Indonesia	Following station
Kramat towards Rajawali	Rajawali–Cikampek	Jatinegara towards Cikampek
