= Meizhou Daily =

Chinese newspaper

- Native name: 湄洲日报
- Type: Daily newspaper
- Publisher: Meizhou Daily Agency
- Founded: November 1947
- Political alignment: Communism; Socialism with Chinese characteristics
- Language: Chinese
- Headquarters: Meizhou, Putian, Fujian
- OCLC number: 947818161
- Website: mzrbs.com.cn

Meizhou Daily (Chinese: 湄洲日报; pinyin: Méizhōu Rìbào), also known as Meizhou Ribao, is a daily newspaper published in simplified Chinese in China. It is the organ newspaper of the Meizhou Municipal Committee of the Chinese Communist Party, and is a comprehensive local political party newspaper. The newspaper was originally sponsored and supervised by the Kuomintang and is now by the Meizhou Municipal Committee of the CCP.

== History ==
Meizhou Daily was inaugurated in November 1947, and its predecessor was the Upright Newspaper (正报), founded by the Upright Newspaper Agency of the KMT's Three Principles of the People Youth Group in Xinghua (国民党三民主义青年团兴化团). At the end of August 1949, the government of Putian County took over the newspaper and changed its name to Putian Telegraph (莆田电讯). On 1 January 1993, the newspaper was renamed to the current name.

=== Reputation infringement case ===
On May 17, 2006, the Chengxiang District Court sentenced Huang Weizhong (黄维忠) to three years' imprisonment for "gathering crowds to disturb social order" (聚众扰乱社会秩序). On the second day of the sentence, Meizhou Daily published an article eagerly about the sentence. On the following day, the newspaper published another commentary, making derogatory comments on Huang Weizhong's sentence. Huang Weizhong, who was still detained in the detention center, decided to file a reputation infringement lawsuit against the Meizhou Daily after learning of the false reports and comments of the newspaper, and entrusted lawyer of Liaoning Dingtai Law Firm (辽宁鼎泰律师事务所) Lu Guang (陆光) and his elder brother Huang Weide (黄维德) to infringe his reputation. On May 29, Huang Weide sent the bill of complaint to the Chengxiang District Court. After the court accepted the complaint, it let Huang go back to wait for the court's notice. However, the court finally decided not to file the case and not issue a written ruling.
