= Kongsi 8 =

Kongsi 8 is an artist collective in Jakarta, Indonesia for women and gender minorities in Indonesia founded in 2021. It is located in the antique market in Jatinegara, East Jakarta. The space is entirely volunteer-run and members share the cost of running the space.

== History ==
Kongsi 8 was established in 2021 by artists Hei Rambulan and Rangga Kusuma. The space was initially started to be a space where women and gender minority artists could collaborate and sell art, but it was not enough to bring in income so they expanded to include a canteen and space to sell secondhand items. The location is also significant as it is where violence erupted during the 1998 riots, which were precipitated by the 1997 Asian financial crisis.

== Programming ==
Kongsi 8 is well known among locals for their varied and unique programming. The space is flexible and can change its function depending on the needs of the members. Besides being a place that sells secondhand items, Kongsi 8 also hosts zine festivals. They also have a regular moderated focus group discussions called "How's your day?" where participants are invited to share their thoughts and opinions on wide-ranging topics. They have "Kantin Rawa Bunga", a budget-friendly mini-canteen where members can cook recipes they like and share them with visitors. There is also a library at the space with a regular book discussion. They also have regular live music events.
