= Kramat railway station =

Railway station in Indonesia

C02 Kramat Station Stasiun Kramat
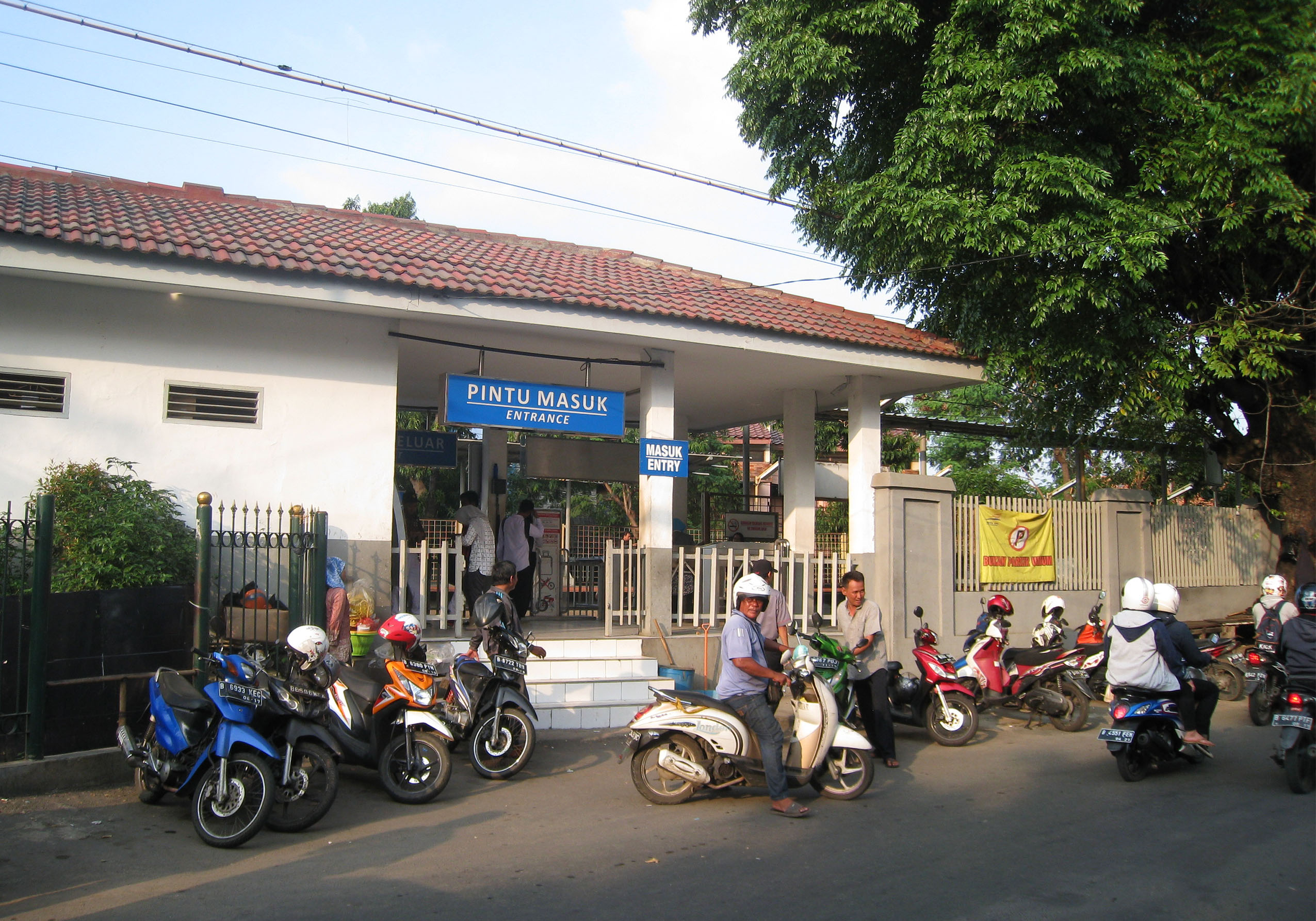
- Entrance of Kramat Station in 2016

General information
- Location: Jl. Percetakan Negara III, Paseban, Senen, Central Jakarta; Indonesia
- Coordinates: 6°11′38″S 106°51′24″E
- Elevation: +10 m (33 ft)
- Owner: Kereta Api Indonesia
- Operator: KAI Commuter
- Lines: Rajawali–Cikampek railway; Cikarang Loop Line
- Platforms: 2 side platforms
- Tracks: 2

Construction
- Structure type: Ground
- Parking: Not available
- Accessible: Available

Other information
- Station code: KMT • 0473
- Classification: Class III

Services
Preceding station		Following station
Gang Sentiong towards Kampung Bandan or Jakarta Kota via Pasar Senen	Cikarang Commuter Line	Pondok Jati towards Bekasi or Cikarang
Location
- Location within Jakarta

Kramat Station (KMT) is a railway station located in Jalan Percetakan Negara III, Paseban, Senen, Central Jakarta, Indonesia. The station is located in the altitude of 10 meters above sea level. This station is located between Gang Sentiong railway station in the north and Pondok Jati railway station in the south. This station serves the Cikarang Loop Line of the KRL Commuterline.

The architecture of Kramat Station is simple and modest, an example of small old train station with short partially unroofed platform. Unlike elevated stations between Cikini and Mangga Besar, or newly renovated Palmerah station, Kramat station still retain its old form, a heritage from colonial Dutch East Indies period. The station location is also quite secluded and not located by the main the road.

Previously, at this station, there was a branch line that led to the State Printing Warehouse in Salemba and Salemba Station.

Kramat Station started to be served by Jatiluhur and Walahar Express local trains since 26 October 2019. To support the operation of local trains, small renovations and passenger flow arrangement has been done. However by 2021 timetable, the local train services at this station has been removed.

== Building and layout ==
This side platform station has two railway lines only and a little bit cramped passenger waiting area.

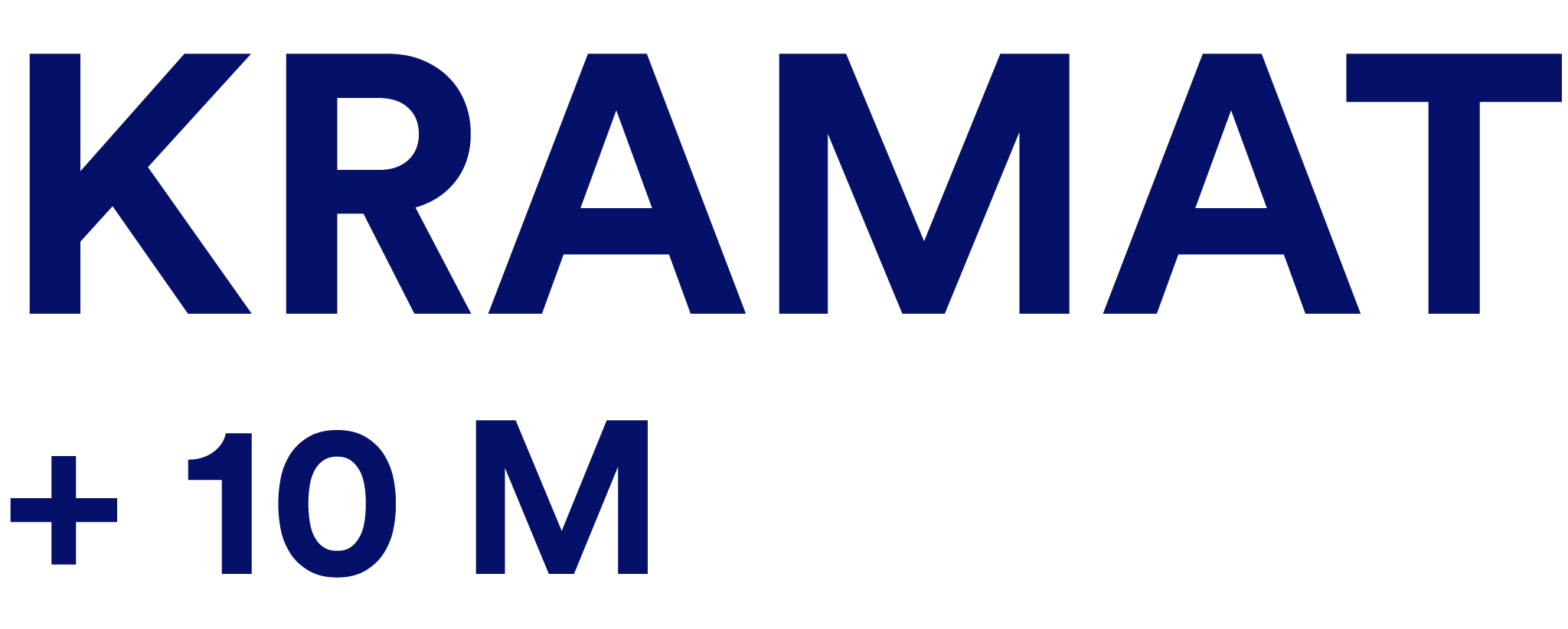
C02
Platform floor	Side platform, the doors are opened on the right side	
Platform floor	Line 1	← (Gang Sentiong) Cikarang Loop Line (counterclockwise loop) towards Kampung Bandan
Platform floor	Line 2	Cikarang Loop Line (clockwise loop) to Cikarang (Pondok Jati) →
Platform floor	Side platform, the doors are opened on the right side	

== Services ==
The following is a list of train services at the Kramat Station.

=== Passenger services ===
- KAI Commuter
  - Cikarang Loop Line (Full Racket)
    - to Cikarang (counter-clockwise via Tanah Abang and Manggarai)
    - to Cikarang (clockwise)

== Supporting transportation ==
Type	Route	Destination
Angkot	JP04	Salemba–Rawasari

Preceding station	Kereta Api Indonesia	Following station
Gang Sentiong towards Rajawali	Rajawali–Cikampek	Pondok Jati towards Cikampek
