= Rawang =

Rawang may refer to:

- Rawang language, a Sino-Tibetan language of India and Myanmar (Burma)
  - Nung Rawang, an ethnic group in Myanmar
- Rawang, Selangor, town in Selangor, Malaysia, the district capital of Gombak until 1997
  - Rawang (federal constituency), in Selangor, Malaysia
  - Rawang (state constituency), in Selangor, Malaysia
  - Rawang railway station, in Gombak, Malaysia
- Rawang Panca Arga, a subdistrict in Asahan Regency, North Sumatra, Indonesia
