= Palmeriam =

- Administrative village
- Interactive map of Palmeriam
- Country: Indonesia
- Province: DKI Jakarta
- Administrative city: East Jakarta
- District: Matraman

Palmeriam is an administrative village (kelurahan in Indonesian) in Matraman district, East Jakarta. The border of Palmeriam are :

- Paseban administrative village, Central Jakarta in the north
- Kebon Manggis administrative village in the west
- Kayu Manis administrative village in the east
- Pisangan Baru administrative village in the south

The postal code of this administrative village is 13140.

== Toponym ==
The name Palmeriam was derived from paal meriam, meaning the place where the cannon were ready to shoot. This name was given by the native people because of a British arsenal in this place. British troops arrived in Batavia from Malacca in August 1811 aiming to seize the Dutch East Indies from the Dutch, who were at the time a vassal state of France. The Dutch army under the leadership of Governor-General Herman Willem Daendels resisted with some success, but was eventually defeated by the British
