= Sim Keng Koen =

Sim Keng Koen, Kapitein-titulair der Chinezen

Luitenant der Chinezen in Batavia
- In office 1880–1887
- Constituency: Batavia

Kapitein der Chinezen in Batavia
- In office 1887–1889
- Constituency: Batavia

Kapitein der Chinezen of Sukabumi
- In office 1892–1899
- Preceded by: New creation
- Succeeded by: Lauw Tjeng Kie, Luitenant der Chinezen
- Constituency: Sukabumi

Personal details
- Born: Batavia, Dutch East Indies
- Died: Sukabumi, Dutch East Indies
- Spouse: Louisa Zecha
- Relations: Che Engku Chesterina (granddaughter); Adrian Lauw Zecha (step-great-grandson)
- Children: Sim Tjeng Bouw; Betsy Lembor Nio Sim-Zecha; Piet Tjeng Ho Sim-Zecha; Chester Tjeng Soan Lauw-Sim-Zecha
- Occupation: Mandarin
- Known for: Role as the first Kapitein der Chinezen of Sukabumi

Sim Keng Koen, Kapitein der Chinezen (died in 1906) was a Chinese-Indonesian bureaucrat and the patriarch of the influential Lauw-Sim-Zecha family, part of the 'Cabang Atas' gentry of the Dutch East Indies (now Indonesia). He was married to Louisa Zecha, the Indo-Bohemian widow of Sim's former employer, Lauw Tek Lok, Luitenant der Chinezen of Bekasi.

Sim began his career as the private secretary of Luitenant Lauw Tek Lok, one of the preeminent Chinese-Indonesian magnates of the second half of the nineteenth century. After leaving Lauw's employ, Sim was appointed Luitenant der Chinezen of the Kong Koan (Chinese Council) of Batavia in 1880. This was a senior civil government post in the Dutch colonial bureaucracy. He was further elevated to the rank of Kapitein in 1887, and was discharged with honour in 1889.

Together with his wife, Louisa Zecha, Sim settled down in Sukabumi, a hill station in the Preanger highlands of West Java. In 1892, he was appointed as the first Hoofd der Chinezen of Sukabumi with the rank of Kapitein-titulair der Chinezen. The sociologist Mely G. Tan calls Sim the most prominent of all of Sukabumi's Chinese headmen, in large part thanks to the high profile of his Eurasian wife. In the course of a violent uprising in Tamboen in the late nineteenth century, and in the absence of any Dutch military response, Sim accompanied Zecha to meet with the insurgents in order to negotiate a surrender. They succeeded in this aim without military intervention. The Kapitein's influence in Sukabumi was such that the local Chinese community celebrated Cap Go Meh a few days later so as to coincide with Sim's birthday festivities.

He requested an honourable discharge from the colonial authorities due to old age, which was granted, in 1899. He died in 1906. That same year, he was succeeded as Hoofd der Chinezen of Sukabumi by his step-nephew, Lauw Tjeng Kie, in which capacity, however, he bore the lower title of Luitenant der Chinezen of Sukabumi (the office having been downgraded in rank from captaincy to a lieutenantcy upon Sim's retirement).

Kapitein Sim Keng Koen is the step-great-grandfather of the hotelier Adrian Lauw-Zecha, the founder of Aman Resorts, and the grandfather of the ballerina Che Engku Chesterina, a princess by marriage of Negeri Sembilan in Malaysia.

Government offices
| Preceded by New creation | Kapitein der Chinezen of Sukabumi; 1892–1899 | Succeeded by Luitenant Lauw Tjeng Kie (as Luitenant) |
