= Adrian Zecha =

Indonesian hotelier

- Born: Adrian Willem Ban Kwie Lauw-Zecha; 1933 (age 92–93); Soekaboemi, Dutch East Indies
- Occupations: Hotelier, businessman
- Known for: Founder of Aman Resorts
- Spouse: Bebe Lauw-Zecha
- Children: Ajai Lauw-Zecha
- Father: Aristide William Lauw-Zecha
- Relatives: Alwin Zecha (Brother); Lauw Tek Lok, Luitenant der Chinezen (paternal great-grandfather); Louisa Zecha (great-grandmother); Sim Keng Koen, Kapitein der Chinezen (step-great-grandfather); Lauw Ho (paternal great-great-grandfather); Michelle Saram (daughter-in-law)

Adrian Willem Ban Kwie Lauw-Zecha (born 1933), better known as Adrian Zecha, is an Indonesian hotelier and founder of several international hotel companies including Aman Resorts, Regent Hotels, GHM Hotels and Azerai Resorts. He is best known for founding Aman Resorts and for his influence on the development of luxury resort design and branding worldwide. Zecha was also part-owner of the renowned London’s Dorchester Hotel, and Bangkok’s The Sukhothai Hotel through his investment company.

== Career ==
Zecha began his career in hospitality in the 1960s and was involved in the early development of Regent International Hotels in partnership with Four Seasons Hotels. He later co-founded GHM (Global Hotel Management), a company that operated luxury properties in Asia and beyond.

In 1988, Zecha founded Aman Resorts, opening the first property, Amanpuri, in Phuket, Thailand. The brand became known for its low-density, design-focused luxury hotels and played a significant role in shaping the high-end resort market in Asia and later globally.

== Personal life and education ==
Zecha was born in 1933 in Sukabumi, in what was then the Dutch East Indies (now Indonesia). He attended school in Jakarta before going on to study at Phillips Academy and later at Oxford University, where he read English literature.

== Family background ==
Zecha was born in Sukabumi, Indonesia into the Lauw-Sim-Zecha family, part of the Cabang Atas or Chinese gentry of colonial Indonesia. His family is of Peranakan Chinese and Bohemian roots. He is a great-grandson of the late nineteenth-century magnate and mandarin Lauw Tek Lok, the first Luitenant der Chinezen of Bekasi (a high-ranking post in the civil bureaucracy) by the latter's controversial interracial marriage to Louisa Zecha, an Indo plantation owner of Bohemian descent. On being widowed, Louisa Zecha went on to marry another Chinese magnate, Sim Keng Koen, the first Kapitein der Chinezen of Sukabumi, where her great-grandson Adrian Lauw Zecha was born.

Zecha's father, the plantation owner Aristide William Lauw-Zecha, was the first native-born Indonesian to graduate from any American university, Iowa University, in 1923. The connection with America continued with Zecha and his four brothers, who were all educated in the United States.

Zecha is also a cousin of the Malaysian royal, Che Engku Chesterina (née Sim-Zecha). His brother, Austen Zecha, was the founder of TBWA-ISC Group, an agency that is credited with the award-winning “Malaysia Truly Asia” campaign for Tourism Malaysia in 1999. Another brother, Alwin Zecha, was the founder and executive chairman of the Pacific Leisure Group, a destination management company with offices in 38 countries worldwide, and also served as a board member and Chairman for numerous other organizations, including PATA.

== Early life and career ==
Zecha attended Dickinson College in Pennsylvania. Following graduation, he briefly attended Johns Hopkins University to pursue a medical degree on his father’s wishes, but later dropped out and instead pursued a Master in Journalism from Columbia University.

In 1956, when President Sukarno nationalised the country's private businesses, many members of the Lauw-Sim-Zecha family fled to Singapore, the Netherlands, and the United States. At the time the 23-year-old Zecha was in New York, working at Time magazine. Between 1956 and 1958, Zecha worked at the magazine's Tokyo office. He took up a residence in Azabu-Jūban and rented a villa in Aburatsubo. During his time in Japan, he developed an appreciation for ryokan-style hotels.

In 1961, Zecha launched Asia Magazine, the first regional newspaper colour supplement in Asia. When the magazine faltered a year later, Rupert Murdoch was persuaded by Zecha to invest in the magazine (in what was his first Asian investment). The magazine was a part of English speaking families until 1998. It was held above water for its last ten years by Giro Semba and Olav Mueller-Uri until it finally closed in 1998.

In 1970, Zecha started a new travel and lifestyle magazine named Orientations based in Hong Kong. With the advent of in-flight magazines, Orientations dropped its travel content and progressed over the years to become a publication focused on the arts of East Asia, Southeast Asia, South Asia and the Himalayas. It is now the leading magazine in this field and its contributors are renowned scholars and researchers from around the world.

== Hotels ==
Zecha's first experience of the hotel business was when a friend asked him to help the Marriott Hotel chain broker land deals in Asia. This experience led to Zecha joining with Robert Burns and Georg Rafael in 1972 to found Regent International Hotels, which was one of Asia's first luxury hotel groups. The trio built 12 hotels before Zecha sold his 30% stake for $30 million in 1986. He then moved into real estate speculation, forming an investment fund that, among other deals, bought Bangkok's Regent Hotel and London's Dorchester Hotel before eventually selling them.

While in Phuket looking for a site upon which to build a holiday home, Zecha was walking along Pansea Beach when he came across a coconut plantation which occupied a prime location. Plans to build a home on a site soon developed into an idea to build a small boutique resort in partnership with longtime friend Anil Thadani. The two spent mainly their own money as no banks would lend for the project due to the small number of planned rooms, instead of the 500-room hotel they thought would be more practical. Amanpuri opened in January 1988 at a cost of US$4 million with only 40 rooms. Its success, followed by that of Amandari in Bali, confirmed to Zecha the viability of a chain of minimalist boutique resorts in remote, natural settings.

In 1992, Zecha sold a controlling interest in Silverlink, the holding company which owned Aman Resorts, to Clement Vaturi, an old friend whose family owned the Hoteliere Immobliere chain of French hotels. Zecha was left with only 45% of the share holdings. The arrangement was satisfactory to both parties until Vaturi's controlling interest effectively came under the control of Los Angeles-based Colony Capital, a real estate investment fund. A lawsuit between Vaturi and Colony Capital promised to drag on, putting Zecha's plans to expand the number of Aman resorts on hold. Dispirited, and by now owning only 45% of Silverlink's shares, he resigned from his position as CEO in 1998.

By 2000, Colony Capital and Vaturi had settled their lawsuit, which led to Vaturi getting his Silverlink shares back. He soon sold his shares to Lee Hing Development, a Hong Kong property fund which was affiliated with Thadani's Schroder Capital Partners (a Singapore-based fund). With the controlling investors now sharing his vision, Zecha returned as chairman and CEO. In the intervening period Zecha founded Maha Resorts, which opened its Hacineda de San Antonio in Mexico in October 2000.

In 2007, Zecha announced that he had reached an agreement with DLF Ltd, India's largest real estate company, to form a partnership to acquire a controlling interest in Aman Resorts for US$250 million. DLF Group sold the company in 2013 to a joint venture between Russian real estate investor Vladislav Doronin and American entrepreneur Omar Amanat for US$358 million. Controversy ensued when Doronin announced that Zecha was stepping down as CEO and that he would assume the position. A London High Court injunction against Doronin reinstated Zecha as CEO, alleging that Doronin did not have board approval to remove him. The ruling, however, was limited, as it returned Zecha to his role for only 17 days. Olivier Jolivet, a longtime Aman executive, was appointed to the role which he held until February 2017.

In addition to his history at Aman Resorts, Zecha also chairman and director of General Hotel Management Ltd (GHM), a developer and manager of luxury hotels and resorts. Zecha was also a partner with Georg Rafael in Rafael Hotels Limited, a company that was sold to Mandarin Oriental Group in May 2000.

In February 2017, Zecha began the soft opening for the first hotel under his new Azerai hotel brand which aims to provide more affordable lodging for adventurers and "the younger crowd". This was followed in 2020 by a venture with Naru Developments to launch Azumi, a ryokan-inspired hotel brand based in Japan.

== Awards ==
In 2005 Adrian Zecha was awarded the Innovation Award at the 16th annual Hotel Investment Conference Asia Pacific (HICAP).

In 2010 Adrian Zecha was awarded the 2010 Travel & Leisure Design Champion Award. The celebration was held at the California Academy of Sciences in San Francisco.

In 2011, he was awarded an award for lifetime achievement during the International Luxury Travel Market event in Shanghai.

In 2018, he received the International Hotel Investment Forum (IHIF) Lifetime Achievement Award.
