= Sunday (2023 film) =

2023 Singaporean film

- Directed by: Sean Ng
- Written by: Sean Ng
- Produced by: Caleb Quek; Huang Tao
- Starring: Rhen Escaño; Ho Thanh Trung; Adrian Pang; Michelle Saram
- Cinematography: Eric Wk Ng; Sean Ng
- Edited by: Neo Rui Xin
- Production companies: Amok; mm2 Entertainment
- Distributed by: mm2 Entertainment
- Release date: 6 December 2023 (SGIFF)
- Running time: 94 minutes
- Country: Singapore
- Languages: English; Tagalog; Vietnamese

Sunday is a 2023 Singaporean romantic drama film written, filmed and directed by Sean Ng. Centering on two foreign workers who fall in love while working in Singapore, the film stars Filipino actress Rhen Escaño and Vietnamese actor Ho Thanh Trung. The film also features Singaporean actors Adrian Pang and Michelle Saram in supporting roles. The film had its world premiere at the Singapore International Film Festival on 6 December 2023.

== Cast ==
- Rhen Escaño as Lily
- Ho Thanh Trung as Minh
- Adrian Pang as Mr Lee
- Michelle Saram as Mrs Lee

== Production ==
A lensing ceremony was held on 16 August 2021.

The directorial feature debut of Sean Ng, Sunday was developed through TorinoFilmLab and is supported by the Singapore Film Commission. Former Raintree Pictures chief Daniel Yun serves as associate producer, while Chang Long Jong, Raymond Quek, Melvin Ang, Ng Say Yong and Gary Goh serve as executive producers. Jonathan Choo, son of veteran actor Zhu Houren, serves as a co-writer on the film.
