= Lauw Ho =

- Died: 1863; Batavia, Dutch East Indies
- Occupations: Revenue farmer, Wijkmeester (ward master) of Meester Cornelis
- Known for: Founder of the Lauw-Sim-Zecha family
- Children: Lauw Tek Lok, Luitenant der Chinezen of Bekasi; Lauw Tek Kang, Luitenant der Chinezen of Meester Cornelis
- Relatives: Louisa Zecha (daughter-in-law); Adrian Lauw-Zecha (great-great-grandson)

Lauw Ho (Chinese: 刘户; died in 1863), also spelled Lauw Houw, was a prominent tax farmer (pachter), tycoon and ancestor of the Lauw-Sim-Zecha family, part of the 'Cabang Atas' gentry of the Dutch East Indies (now Indonesia).

Between 1845 and 1861, Lauw held various pachten or revenue farms, including for pawn houses, slaughterhouses, fish and – in particular – for gambling, over which he intermittently acted as Hoofdpachter or head revenue farmer. The pacht or revenue farm was a system of tax collection, in which the Dutch colonial authorities outsourced tax collection to the highest bidding revenue farmers. Together with Gouw Kang Soei, Tan Ling, Khouw Siong Bo and Tan Kong Boen, Lauw was also part of the Ngo Ho Tjiang partnership or kongsi, which dominated the opium pacht – the most lucrative of all the revenue farms. The proceeds from revenue farming made Lauw one of the wealthiest tycoons in the Dutch East Indies.

Despite his vast wealth, Lauw's application for an honorary appointment as Luitenant-titulair der Chinezen did not succeed, probably because, as a newly-rich man, he did not come from an established family of Chinese officers. The Chinese officership was a very prestigious and senior civil government post in the Dutch colonial bureaucracy: appointments tended to be doled out on a near-hereditary basis to a small number of interrelated families - the so-called Cabang Atas gentry. Lauw did, however, serve in the bureaucracy in a lesser capacity as Wijkmeester, or ward master, of Meester Cornelis. Before Lauw died in 1863, however, he had the satisfaction of seeing his two sons, Lauw Tek Kang and Lauw Tek Lok, raised to the Chinese officership on December 23, 1854 as Luitenants der Chinezen, of their father's old district of Meester Cornelis and neighbouring Bekasi respectively. These appointments signalled the elevation of Lauw's family to the ranks of the Cabang Atas. Through Luitenant Lauw Tek Lok, Lauw Ho is the great-great-grandfather of the hotelier Adrian Lauw-Zecha, founder of Aman Resorts.
