= Azerai =

Hotel chain

Azerai Resorts
- Trade name: Azerai Resorts
- Company type: Private limited company
- Industry: Hospitality
- Founded: 2017
- Founder: Adrian Zecha
- Headquarters: Singapore
- Number of locations: 3 resorts (2021)
- Website: azerai.com

Azerai is a Singapore-based multinational hotel chain. The company currently operates three hotels in Vietnam. The company was founded by Indonesian-hotelier Adrian Zecha, and commenced operations in 2017 with the opening of the group's first hotel in Luang Prabang, Laos.

== History ==
After leaving Aman Resorts in 2014, Adrian Zecha founded Azerai to operate affordable-luxury lodging, competing in the 3-4 star hotel category. The brand operates small hotels, each typically having no more than 80 rooms, and targets the millennial demographic. The company's background is traced back to the Serai Hotel in Karangasem, founded by Zecha to offer various frills and design features reminiscent of an Aman Resort albeit competing at a lower, affordable price point. The Serai concept later served as the precursor of Azerai after The Serai was rebranded to create the first Alila hotel. The company's name originated from a portmanteau of Zecha's initials and the now-defunct Serai brand, the latter's name of which was derived from the suffix of the Persian word caravanserai.

In an interview with Hong Kong's Prestige magazine, Zecha stated that "Azerai resorts are designed in an elegant, refined and understated manner, and seek to embrace and blend into the locations in which they are set".

In 2017, the first Azerai opened in Luang Prabang, occupying the premises of the 53-room Phousi Hotel. The hotel closed in 2018 and reopened as an Avani Hotel operated by Thailand-based Minor International. Following its closure in Luang Prabang, the company opened Azerai Can Tho in Vietnam in 2018, which was followed by second hotel in Hue in 2019.

In 2019, Time magazine named Azerai La Residence in its list of the world's greatest places to stay.

== Properties ==
Azerai operates three hotels in Vietnam, with one hotel planned for Indonesia.

Vietnam

- Azerai Resort, Cần Thơ
- Azerai La Residence, Huế
- Azerai Ke Ga Bay, Tân Thành - previously Princess D'Annam Resort

Indonesia

- Azerai Ungasan, Bali (planned)
