= Che Engku Chesterina =

Indonesian ballerina and Malaysian royal

Che Engku Chesterina (born Chesterina Sim-Zecha in 1943) is a former Indonesian ballerina who became a Malaysian royal after marrying Tunku Tan Sri Abdullah, a prince of Negeri Sembilan and founder of Melewar Group.

Che Engku Chesterina was born into the Lauw-Sim-Zecha family, a prominent Peranakan family of the Cabang Atas or the Chinese gentry of colonial Indonesia. She is descended from Louisa Zecha, an Indo planter of Bohemian descent, by her second marriage to Sim Keng Koen, the first Kapitein der Chinezen of Sukabumi, the Dutch-appointed head of the local Chinese community. She is also a cousin of the hotelier and founder of Aman Resorts, Adrian Zecha.

Chesterina Sim-Zecha moved to England to study ballet in 1956 at The Legat School under the tutelage of Madam Nadine Nicolaeva-Legat. While working in Rodgers and Hammerstein's musical, “Flower Drum Song” in London's West End, Sir Peter Wright discovered Chesterina's exceptional talent. She was given the starring role of Odette in Swan Lake at the Festival of Cork. She then joined as one of the pioneer dancers of Stuttgart Ballet in Germany under John Cranko.

Chesterina retired from dancing in 1973 when she married into the royal house of Negeri Sembilan. Upon marriage, she acquired the royal title of Che Engku or princess. She is the Honorary Patron of the Central School of Classical Ballet in Western Australia.
