= Senen =

Subdistrict in Central Jakarta Administrative City, Indonesia

- District
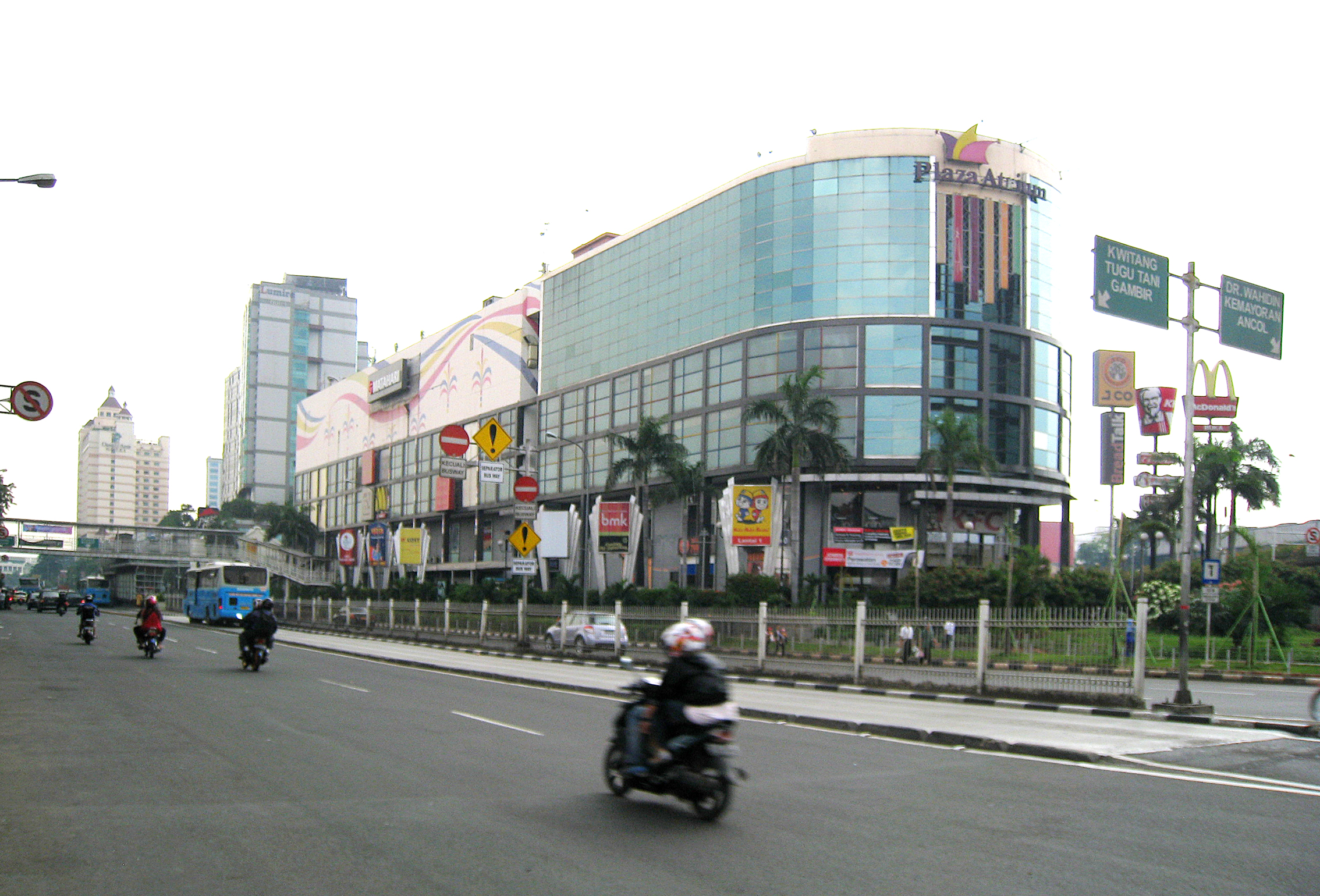
- Plaza Atrium in Senen
- Location in Central Jakarta
- Coordinates: 6°11′07″S 106°50′41″E
- Country: Indonesia
- Province: Jakarta
- Administrative city: Central Jakarta

Area
  - Total: 4.23 km^{2} (1.63 sq mi)
- Postal code: 104XX

Senen is a long-established urban district (Indonesian: kecamatan) of Central Jakarta, Indonesia, that has kept many tourist attractions such as two museums, the National Library of Indonesia, Gelanggang Remaja Senen, and narrow alleys with old Chinese and similar style shops and restaurants. It was first developed in the 18th century as Pasar Senen when Governor Daendels established the bovenstad (the upper town) as the new center of government of the fledgling city (then known as Batavia). Its core remains in what is now the lower-division Senen District, Kwitang, Kenari, Paseban, Kramat, and Bungur. Senen is bounded by a railway line to the east, Ciliwung River to the west, Pramuka Street to the south, and Abdul Rahman Saleh-Kwini II-Senen Raya IV Street to the north. The name is derived from Pasar Senen, (lit. 'Monday market').

== History ==
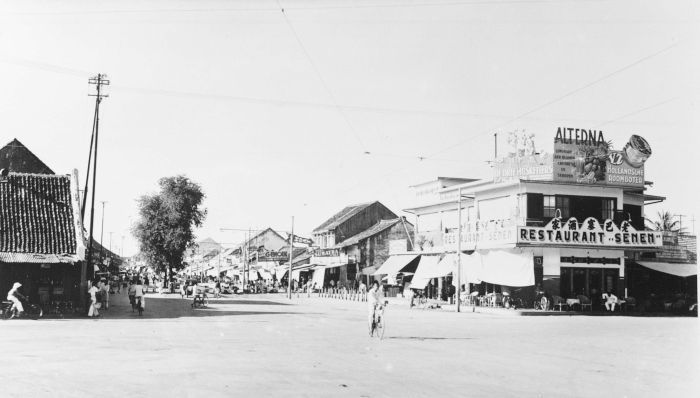
Early 20th century photo of Pasar Senen

=== Early establishment ===
Following the establishment of the upper town (bovenstad) of Batavia, Justinus Vinck, a Dutch entrepreneur, decided to develop two markets to serve the upper town. On 30 August 1733, Vinck established two markets: Pasar Tanah Abang (erroneously spelled as Tanabang) to the southwest of Koningsplein and Pasar Senen (variously spelled as Pasar Senin, Bazaar Senin, Passar Senen, Passer Senen) to the east of Koningsplein and its broader Weltevreden suburb (meaning well-contented), a European-centric neighborhood of the upper town. Both markets were connected with a road simply known as weg van Tanabang naar Weltevreden, which would later become Jalan Kwitang & KH. Wahid Hasyim. The market site stood straddling today's Segitiga Senen ("Senen Triangle") and Pasar Senen (the government-owned market between the train station and Senen Street).

In the beginning of the 19th century, Pasar Senen became the focal point of Weltevreden, hosting the military heart of Weltevreden, the Kampementen along the road from the old town to Meester Cornelis (Matramanweg, then Kramat Raya / Salemba Raya streets). Settlements also prospered along this road, such as Kampung Kwitang, Kampung Kramat, and Kampung Salemba or Slemba. Several forts and military complexes were established to keep the security of the road.

Pasar Senen also became the gateway of the city for people coming from the kampung to the east.

=== Modern colonialism ===
As time went on, Pasar Senen grew into a mainly Chinese commercial center. Its heart became partly filled with Chinese-style shophouses and narrow alleyways (Dutch gang[en]). Among these were Gang Wang Seng, Gang Kenanga Noord, Gang Kenanga Zuid in what is now Segitiga Senen; and Gang Senen Binnen in what is now Pasar Senen.

The road to and from Meester Cornelis thrived as well. It was much-lined with the façades of three key employment sites with Ciliwung river views behind the STOVIA, an opium factory, and a military complex.

In the late 19th century, Pasar Senen was traversed by a railway and street tramlines. In 1886, a railway station was established to the east of Pasar Senen, serving as a logistic station for the area. A newer station was built a few yards to the east of the older station in 1925. Pasar Senen became Jakarta's busiest commercial and entertainment center.

The beginning of the 20th century saw several theatres/cinemas set up locally such as the Rex and Grand Theater Cinemas.

=== Post-independence period ===
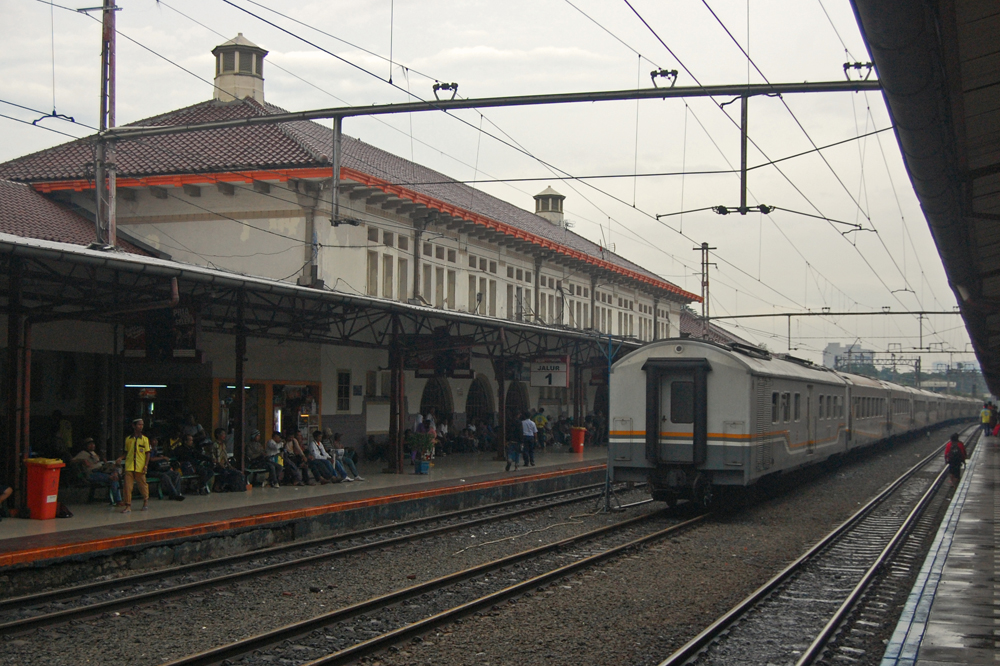
Senen Station, the main station of Senen District

Following the independence of Indonesia, people from around the country began to flock to the new capital in search of opportunities. The Pasar Senen area, originally a Chinese-dominated area, became populated by Bantenese, Sundanese, Minang, and Batak traders and employees during the 1950s.

By the late 1950s, Pasar Senen had deteriorated into a slum and became a hub for gangs, illegal gambling, prostitutes, and pickpockets. This reputation continues to this day despite the multiple revitalization of the area. The area near Pasar Senen railway station became Jakarta's main red light district. Economically and socially marginalized such as the homeless, market sellers, prostitutes, criminals, gamblers, and lower-income artists and contract laborers were drawn to Senen. The red light district received the nickname "Planet Senen", a playful term alluding to the space race between the Soviet Union and the United States in the 1960s, as well as its relative isolation from the rest of Jakarta. The area was referred to as "a black place" (daerah hitam), a place without governance, with dead bodies on the side of the road. Quasi-prostitution was common in downtown Senen, with doger dancers (penari doger). The dances are performed by women wearing a very tight and very thin kebaya dress and a batik cloth. They wore locally-made lipstick and powder as imported cosmetics were too dear. These dancers were mostly immigrants from eastern areas such as Klender and Bekasi. Such dancers began to earn from the early evenings onwards. Men may touch and kiss them for a price. Such paid performance and companionship even took place in carriages when close to the Pasar Senen railway station.

Planet Senen also became a popular meeting place for young artists, poets, and writers in the 1950s and '60s. Every such Seniman Senen (senen artist) would congregate in local venues to discuss the philosophies and aesthetics of Jakarta. Among these were Sukarno M. Noor, Rendra Karno, Dahlia, Nurnaningsih, A.N. Alcaff, Benyamin Sueb, Bing Slamet, and Misbach Yusa Biran.

Dangdut, a genre of Indonesian urban music, developed in marginalized urban neighborhoods in the late 1960s and early 1970s such as Bangunrejo in Surabaya, Sunan Kuning in Semarang, and Planet Senen in Jakarta. Dangdut musicians who started their career in Planet Senen were Asmin Cayder, Rhoma Irama, Mukhsin Alatas, Husein Bawafie, and Mashabi.

=== Project Senen (1960s) ===
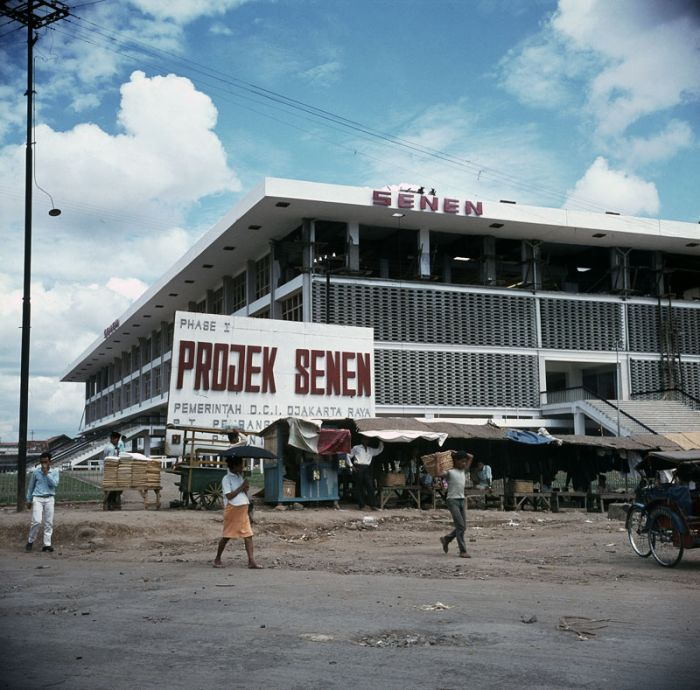
Proyek Senen, a revitalization of Pasar Senen initiated in the 1960s

In 1962, the government of Jakarta and several private investors formed PT Pembangunan Jaya as a joint public-private partnership to revitalize Senen and replace the old shops. The strategy, known as the Project Senen (Proyek Senen) replaced the old Chinese shops with a complex of modern shopping centers, consisting of six modern market blocks numbered I to VI. This plan displaced many urban dwellers from the original Planet Senen. Construction of Block I started in 1962 and was completed in 1966. The last Block, VI, was completed in 1977; a new bus terminal was built next to this in 1980.

In 1973, as part of the revitalization strategy of Pasar Senen, the Planet Senen prostitution and gambling complex was shut down. Senen sex workers were displaced to Kramat Tunggak, North Jakarta, by Governor Ali Sadikin, which would also become the largest red light district in later years. In 1968, the Taman Ismail Marzuki Arts Center in nearby Cikini was established as a new congregation point for Senen artists and poets.

On 15 January 1974, students from the Planet Senen youth center demonstrated against the government's policy regarding the role of foreign investment in Indonesia. Starting at the front of the Senen market, the demonstration led to a series of riots known as the Malari incident. The riots attacked the visible Japanese presence in Indonesia such as an Astra dealership selling Toyota-brand cars on Sudirman Street. Later the riots shifted to an anti-Chinese Indonesian pogrom, attacking stores owned by ethnic Chinese, including the Senen shopping complex.

== Districts ==
The district of Senen is divided into six administrative villages (kelurahan):

Name	Postal/area code	Notes
Senen	10410	
Kwitang	10420	Kwitang book market is notable
Kenari	10430	Hosts the University of Indonesia and Cipto Mangunkusumo Hospital; southerly.
Paseban	10440	
Kramat	10450	
Bungur	10460	

== Transport ==
The district is served by Pasar Senen railway station and Senen bus/coach terminal/station for Transjakarta and Metrotrans bus services. Important roads include Kramat Raya Road (the main road that formerly linked Jakarta with Jatinegara) and Senen Raya Street (the focal point of the Senen market).

== Present time ==
In 1990, the government built a modern shopping center, the Atrium, which before the 1997 Asian financial crisis hosted the international brands of Yaohan and Marks & Spencer as its anchor tenants.

With the trend of transit-oriented development in Jakarta ushered in by the construction of infrastructure projects such as the Jakarta Mass Rapid Transit, Senen will be subjected to a new urban design scheme that integrates the existing infrastructure Pasar Senen railway station, the TransJakarta bus rapid transit, and the future Jakarta Mass Rapid Transit station for the east–west line.

== Landmarks ==
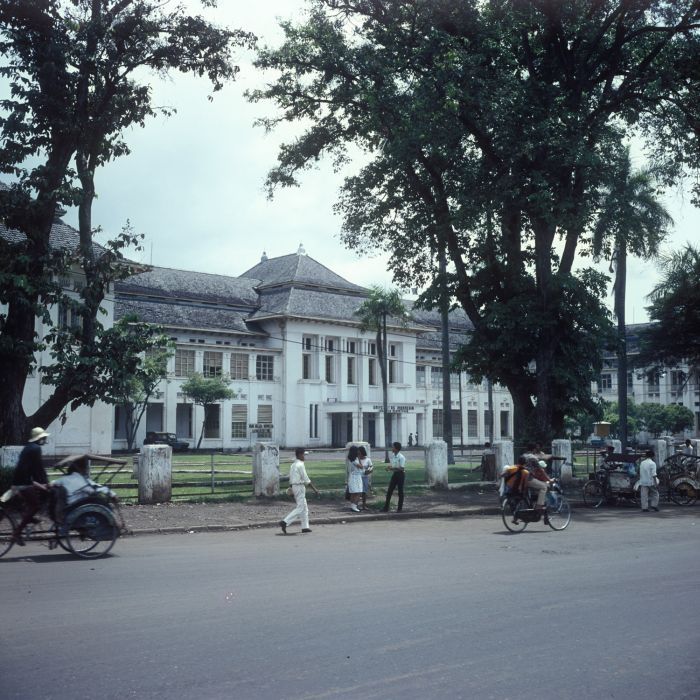
Faculty of Medicine, University of Indonesia during the 1970s

The following historic landmarks and important places are located within Senen:
Within the historic Senen

- Gelanggang Remaja Senen
- Grand Theater cinema
- Pasar Senen Station
- Senen Shopping Centre (consists of Pasar Senen and Plaza Atrium Senen)

Within the District of Senen

- Cipto Mangunkusumo Central Hospital
- Faculty of Medicine of the University of Indonesia
- Museum of Indonesian National Awakening (formerly the STOVIA medical school)
- National Library of Indonesia
- St. Carolus Hospital, Paseban administrative village
- Sumpah Pemuda Museum
- Vincentius orphanage (built about 1855)
- The Wayang Orang Bharata Theatre which stages Wayang orang shows on most Saturday nights

=== Grand Senen Theatre ===
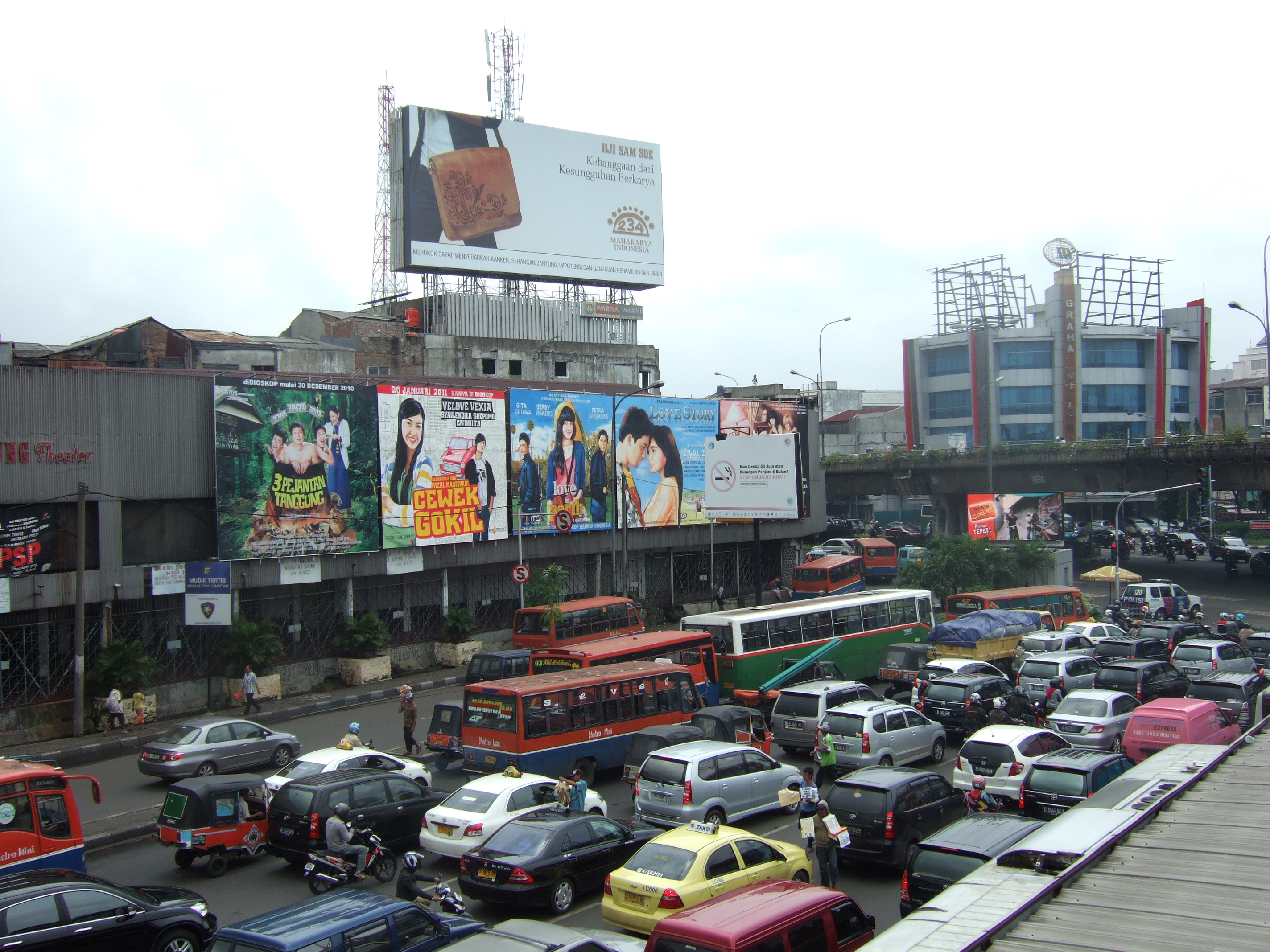
Grand Theater cinema complex, Jakarta's oldest surviving cinema, dates back to the 1930s.

The Grand Theater was a cinema hall located at Senen in Jakarta, Indonesia. The cinema dates back to the 1930s when it was called Rex Cinema and was centrally located in Batavia's trade and entertainment district Senen. Despite its history, the cinema was in extremely poor condition and survived by offering low-budget films usually in the horror or erotic genres before closing in 2016.

Grand Theater dates back to the 1930s when it was called the Kramat Theatre. The cinema was prominent as it was centrally located in Weltevreden's entertainment district, Senen. In 1935, Kramat Theatre was renamed Rex Theatre. In November 1946, the cinema received the name November 1946 after a total renovation. The cinema's golden age was during the 1930s up until the 1950s, an era in Jakarta before television was available.

When television became available in Indonesia many cinemas in Jakarta closed including its oldest, the Globe, which opened in 1910. The Globe closed in 2009. Grand Theatre survived by offering low-budget horror and erotic films. With the closing of the Globe, Grand Theater became the oldest in Jakarta before its closure in 2016. Attempts by director Joko Anwar to revive the cinema for a screening of Impetigore in 2019 were cancelled due to permit issues.

=== Senen Monument of Struggle ===
Senen Monument of Struggle (Monumen Perjuangan Senen) is a monument located within the complex of Gelanggang Remaja Senen (Senen Youth Center). The monument was officially inaugurated by the mayor of Central Jakarta A. Munir on 2 May 1982. It was erected to commemorate the revolutionary struggle in maintaining the self-proclaimed independence of Indonesia from the Allied occupation, specifically the arrival of the warship of the Allied in Jakarta Bay on 29 September 1945.

The monument was designed by native sculptor Sadiman, Suhartono, and Haryang Iskandar, and painter Suyono Palal. It is made with cement concrete cast from Sleman Regency, Central Java.

== See also ==
- List of colonial buildings and structures in Jakarta

== Cited works ==
- de Vletter, M.E.; Voskuil, R.P.G.A.; van Diessen, J.R. (May 1997). Batavia/Djakarta/Jakarta Beeld van een metamorfose. Purmerend: Asia Maior. ISBN 9074861091.
- Merrillees, Scott (2015). Jakarta: Portraits of a Capital 1950-1980. Jakarta: Equinox Publishing. ISBN 9786028397308.
- Kaart van Batavia en Omstreken [Map of Batavia and Surrounding] (Map) (Batavia ed.). 1:20000 (in Dutch). Cartography by Topografische Bureau. 1897. Archived from the original on 18 August 2016.
- Kaart van de Ommelanden van Batavia [Map of the Surrounding of Batavia] (Map) (Batavia ed.). 1:15000 (in Dutch). Cartography by C. Oehler. 1825.
- Shahab, Alwi (2006). Cerita Cerita Betawi - Maria van Engels: menantu Habib Kwitang [Betawi Stories - Maria van Engels: Daughter in Law of Habib Kwitang]. Jakarta: Republika. ISBN 9789793210728.
- Weintraub, Andrew Noah (2010). Dangdut Stories: A Social and Musical History of Indonesia's Most Popular Music. New York City: Oxford University Press. ISBN 9780199780235.
- Winet, Evan Darwin (2010). Indonesian Postcolonial Theatre: Spectral Genealogies and Absent Faces. Hampshire: Springer. ISBN 9780230246676.
- Yayasan Abipraya Komunika & Yayasan Mitra Sembilan Enam (1997). Tracing the Path of Discovery. Jakarta: Gedung Kesenian Jakarta. ISBN 9789799527004.
