= KMT (disambiguation) =

KMT often refers to Kuomintang, a political party in Taiwan.

KMT or kmt may also refer to:

- "KMT" (song), 2017, by Drake
- Kmt (magazine), on ancient Egypt
- kilometre-tonne, km⋅t, or kmt, a unit of payload-distance
- King in Council (Sweden) or K.M:t, until 1975
- Komeito, a political party in Japan
- Kramat railway station, a railway station in Jakarta, Indonesia
- km.t, a name for ancient Egypt using the hieroglyph Km
