= Michelle Saram-Zecha =

Singaporean actress and singer (born 1974)

- 郑雪儿
- Born: Michelle Alicia Saram; 12 December 1974 (age 51); Singapore
- Other names: Cheng Suet Yee; Mo Ya Lun
- Education: Nanyang Technological University
- Occupations: Actress; singer; businesswoman
- Years active: 1997−present
- Spouse: Ajai Lauw-Zecha (m. 2010)
- Relatives: Adrian Lauw-Zeca (father-in-law)
- Awards: Full list
- Musical career
- Genres: Mandopop
- Instrument: Vocals
- Label: Sony Music

Chinese name
- Traditional Chinese: 鄭雪兒
- Simplified Chinese: 郑雪儿
- Hanyu Pinyin: Zhèng Xuě'ér
- Jyutping: Zeng6 Syut3 Ji4

Alternative Chinese name
- Traditional Chinese: 莫雅倫
- Simplified Chinese: 莫雅伦
- Hanyu Pinyin: Mò Yàlún
- Jyutping: Mok6 Ngaa3 Leon4

Michelle Saram-Zecha (born Michelle Alicia Saram; 12 December 1974) is a Singaporean businesswoman, former actress and singer. She played the role of Ye Sha in Meteor Garden II (2002).

== Early life ==
Her father is a Singaporean of Indian descent, and her mother is a Chinese Singaporean.

Saram was educated at CHIJ Katong Convent, Temasek Junior College and Nanyang Technological University where she majored in Mass Communications. She was awarded the Nanyang Outstanding Young Alumni Award by her alma mater in 2006.

== Career ==
In June 1997, Saram joined the entertainment industry after co-starring in an advertisement for One2Free with Hong Kong actor Aaron Kwok. In May 2000, she released her debut album Don't play dumb (別裝傻).

Saram joined Singapore television station MediaCorp and won the Star Awards for Top 10 Most Popular Female Artistes twice. In 2002, she starred in the Taiwanese drama Meteor Garden II as Ye Sha, a girl who accidentally meets Daoming Si (played by Jerry Yan) in Barcelona. Since then, she is one of the few local actresses who have played lead roles in television dramas from Singapore, Taiwan and Hong Kong.

Saram subsequently left the entertainment industry to concentrate on running her food and beverage business. Sixteen years later, she collaborated with Louis Koo in the 2017 Hong Kong action film Paradox. Shortly after, she focuses again on her food and beverage business.

Saram appeared in the film Back to the Past, a movie that was delayed and unreleased for more than four years and ultimately released in 2025. Later on, she appeared in the 2023 film Sunday with Philippine actress Rhen Escaño and Vietnamese actor Ho Thanh Trung.

== Personal life ==
Saram is married to Chinese Indonesian socialite Ajai Lauw-Zecha, son of businessman Adrian Lauw-Zecha, founder of Aman Resorts and a scion of the Lauw-Sim-Zecha family, part of the Cabang Atas or Chinese gentry of colonial Indonesia. After marrying, Saram gradually faded out of the media spotlight.

== Discography ==
- Don't play dumb (2000)

== Filmography ==
=== Television series ===
Year	Title	Role	Notes	Ref
2000	At the Threshold of an Era	Fanny Chun Suk-fan		
2001	A Step into the Past	Princess Chiu Sin		
2002	Fantasy (星梦情真)	Qianqian		
2002	Meteor Garden II	Ye Sha		
2003	Baby Boom	Kristen		
2004	To Mum With Love (非一般妈妈)			
2004	City of Sky (天空之城)	Xia Rui		
2006	Love at 0 °C	Anna		
2018	Flying Tiger (飛虎之潛行極戰)	Xue Er		
2020	Who Sells Bricks in Hong Kong (地產仔)			

=== Film ===
Year	Title	Role	Notes	Ref
1999	Bullets Over Summer (爆裂刑警)	Yen		
2017	Paradox	Lee Chung-chi's wife	Guest appearance	
2023	Sunday	Mrs Lee		
2025	Back to the Past	Princess Chiu Sin		

== Awards and nominations ==
Year	Ceremony	Category	Nominated work	Result	Ref
2001	Star Awards	Top 10 Most Popular Female Artistes	—N/a	Won	
2002	Star Awards	Top 10 Most Popular Female Artistes	—N/a	Won	
