= Tunku Dato' Yaacob Khyra =

Malaysian businessman

Tunku Dato' Yaacob Khyra is a Malaysian businessman and a corporate executive known for his active involvement in the governance and restructuring of Malaysian public-listed companies, particularly KNM Group Berhad.

== Career ==
=== KNM Group ===
Tunku Dato' Yaacob Khyra first joined the board of KNM Group Berhad during a period in which the company was facing financial and restructuring challenges.

In February 2023, he became the non-executive chairman of KNM Group Berhad by holding an indirect 9.44% stake in KNM. Additionally, he is also the executive chairman of MAA Group Bhd and holds an indirect stake of 41.81%.

=== Shareholder Dispute ===
In 2023, KNM Group faced a shareholder contest involving efforts to replace the company's board of directors. However, Tunku Yaacob still remained chairman after shareholders voted against resolutions seeking the removal of the existing board at an extraordinary general meeting (EGM).

The dispute received attention across business media due to the competition between shareholder groups seeking influence over the company during its restructuring process.

=== Shareholding in KNM Group ===
Business media reported that Tunku Dato' Yaacob Khyra had upped his stakes in KNM Group during the company's restructuring period, after MAA Group Bhd purchased a 2.25% stake in the group for RM15.04 million.

This raised Tunku Dato' Yaacob Khyra’s indirect shareholding in KNM to 475.2 million shares or an 11.75% stake, split between MAA (10.8%) and Melewar Industrial Group Bhd (MIG) (0.94%). Tunku controls a 41.82% stake in MAA via Melewar Equities Sdn Bhd and Melewar Acquisitions Ltd. He also holds 46.9% indirect stake in MIG.

== Public Profile ==
Tunku Dato’ Yaacob Khyra is a member of the Negeri Sembilan Royal Family. He commenced his career in finance after gaining an accountancy background and went on to lead several public listed companies. He plays a major role in raising investments for MAA Group, and is committed towards building a strong community and contributing to charity. Currently, he serves as the chairman of The Budimas Charitable Foundation.
