= Louisa Zecha =

Indonesian community leader (1848–1939)

- Born: Francisca Louisa Zecha; 1848; Batavia, Dutch East Indies
- Died: 1939 (aged 90–91); Sukabumi, Dutch East Indies
- Occupation: Community leader
- Known for: Matriarch of the Lauw-Sim-Zecha family
- Spouse(s): Lauw Tek Lok, Luitenant der Chinezen of Bekasi; Sim Keng Koen, Kapitein der Chinezen of Sukabumi
- Children: Christian Tjeng Soey Lauw-Zecha; Maximiliaan Theodoor Tjeng Kiet Lauw-Zecha; Louis Tjeng Bie Lauw-Zecha; Emilia Joe Nio Lauw-Zecha; Cornelia Sebastiana Gobang Nio Lauw-Zecha; Sim Tjeng Bouw; Betsy Lembor Nio Sim-Zecha; Piet Tjeng Ho Sim-Zecha; Chester Tjeng Soan Lauw-Sim-Zecha
- Relatives: Che Engku Chesterina (granddaughter); Adrian Lauw-Zecha (great-grandson)

Francisca Louisa Zecha (1848–1939), usually known as Louisa Zecha, was a prominent, colonial Indonesian community leader and the Indo-Bohemian matriarch of the Lauw-Sim-Zecha family, part of the 'Cabang Atas' gentry of the Dutch East Indies (today Indonesia). She attracted significant attention due to her controversial interracial marriages to two Peranakan Chinese magnates, Lauw Tek Lok, Luitenant der Chinezen of Bekasi and Sim Keng Koen, Kapitein der Chinezen of Sukabumi. The posts of Kapitein and Luitenant der Chinezen were high-ranking civil administration positions in the Dutch colonial bureaucracy. Zecha's community leadership, philanthropy, personal bravery and longevity earned her widespread respect and admiration in colonial society by the time she died in 1939.

== Biography ==
Born in 1848 in Batavia, Java, Francisca Louisa Zecha was the daughter of a Bohemian engraver and adventurer, Josef Zecha. Her first husband, Lauw Tek Lok, was a prominent and wealthy landlord who served as the Luitenant der Chinezen of Bekasi for 28 years from 1854 until his death in 1882. The couple had five children: Christian Tjeng Soey Lauw-Zecha, Maximiliaan Theodoor Tjeng Kiet Lauw-Zecha, Louis Tjeng Bie Lauw-Zecha, Emilia Joe Nio Lauw-Zecha and Cornelia Sebastiana Gobang Nio Lauw-Zecha.

After her first husband's death, Zecha married his former private secretary, Sim Keng Koen, who – after his secretarial employment – had carved out a successful bureaucratic career, having been appointed Luitenant der Chinezen of the Kong Koan (Chinese Council) of Batavia in 1880. They had four children: Sim Tjeng Bouw, Betsy Lembor Nio Sim-Zecha, Piet Tjeng Ho Sim-Zecha and Chester Tjeng Soan Lauw-Sim-Zecha. Zecha's second husband was promoted to the rank of Kapitein in 1887, and kept his post until 1889.

In 1892, with the couple having settled in Sukabumi, West Java, the former Kapitein Sim Keng Koen was appointed the first Hoofd der Chinezen of Sukabumi with the rank of Kapitein-titulair der Chinezen. According to the sociologist Mely G. Tan, the Lauw-Sim-Zecha family lived as Sukabumi's premier Chinese family; Tan attributes a great part of the Kapitein's high profile and influence to Zecha's personality.

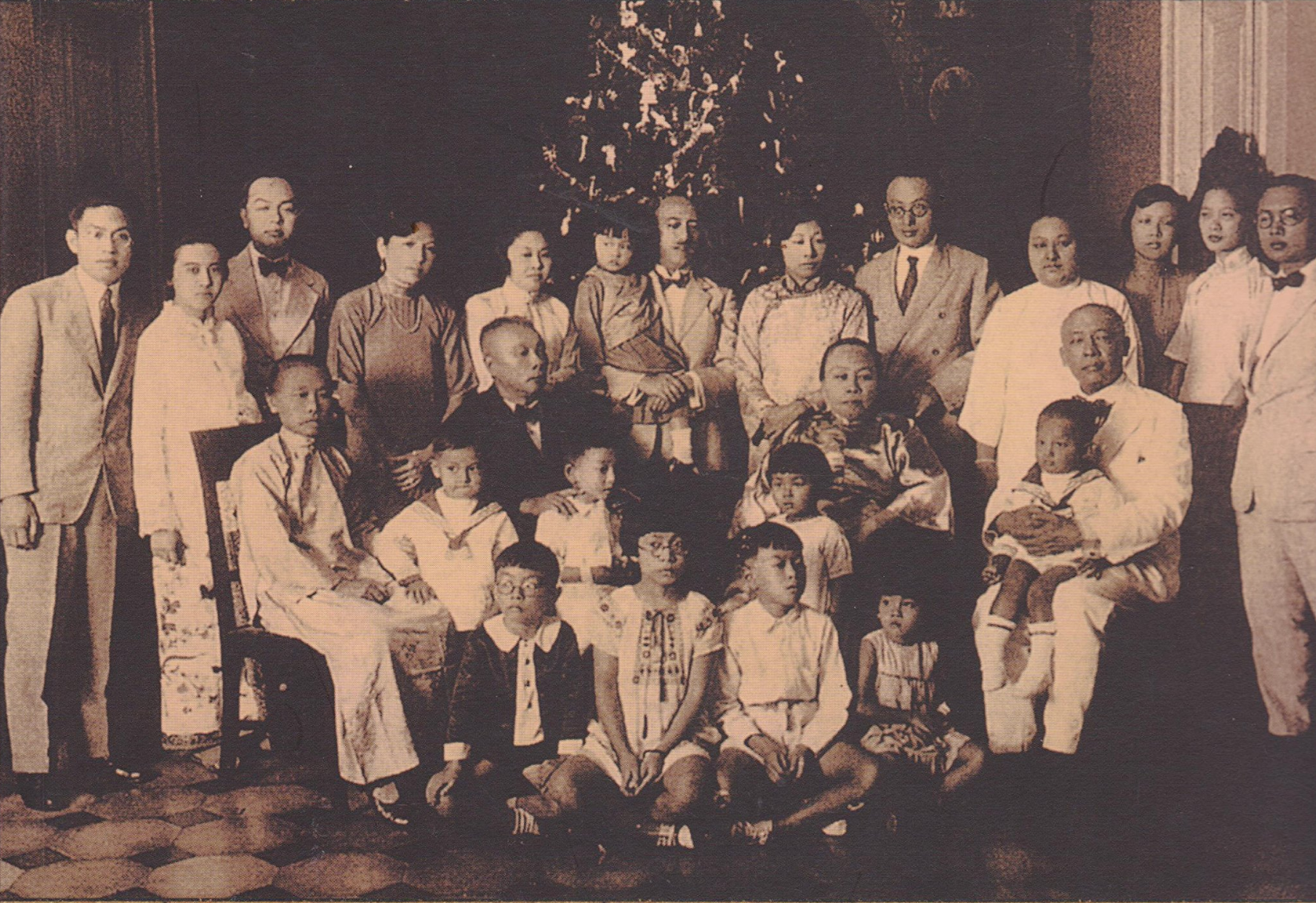
The Lauw-Sim-Zecha family in the early 20th century

At the end of the nineteenth century, in the face of a violent uprising in Tamboen and in the absence of any Dutch military response, Zecha showed great personal courage. Accompanied by her husband, she rode on horseback to meet directly with the insurgents, whom she addressed in person and talked into surrendering. Zecha subsequently rode on her own to Meester Cornelis to notify the authorities of the surrender, and that no military action was needed.

She was well known for her philanthropy. In 1916, she initiated the installation of a statue of the god Kongco Han Tan Kong at Sukabumi's main Chinese temple, Wihara Widhi Sakti, in order to provide a moral inspiration to the town's Chinese community during an ongoing and persistent cholera epidemic. She also spearheaded more practical measures to address the epidemic at her own expense: she personally led a team of hundreds to prepare ammonia drinks, and had the Great Post Road and the road to Pelabuhan Ratu disinfected with oil. Zecha also raised funds and supplies for outbreaks of famines in China in the early twentieth century, for which she was honoured by the Qing Dynasty authorities.

Zecha died in 1939. The historian Theodore Friend relates: 'When the grand dame was dying, she had a gramophone put on the table next to her bed and ordered "You don't cry, you play me my favorite Viennese waltzes." Her family kept her body in state over ice for weeks, until friends from all over the world could come to final services.'

Zecha's descendants from both of her marriages have maintained their prominence, despite the Revolution of 1945-1950, in Indonesia and the region to this day. Her great-grandson, the hotelier Adrian Lauw-Zecha, is the founder of Aman Resorts, while her granddaughter, the ballerina Che Engku Chesterina, is a princess by marriage of Negeri Sembilan in Malaysia.
