= Lauw-Sim-Zecha family =

Family of the Cabang Atas gentry

- Current region: Jakarta, Bekasi, Depok, Sukabumi
- Founder: Lauw Ho
- Members: Lauw Tek Lok, Luitenant der Chinezen; Sim Keng Koen, Kapitein der Chinezen; Louisa Zecha; Adrian Lauw Zecha; Che Engku Chesterina (née Lauw-Sim-Zecha)
- Estate: Cimanggis

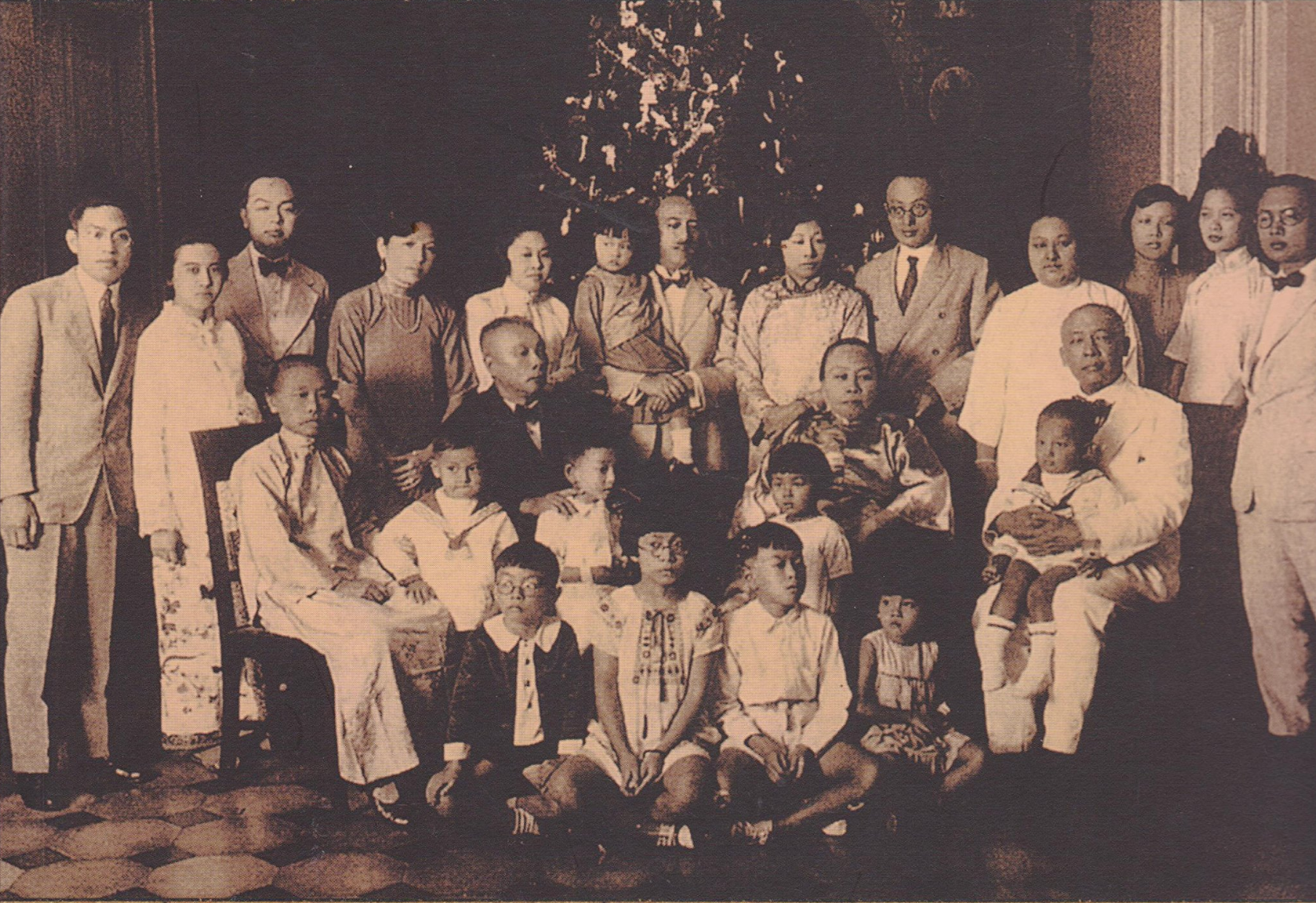
The Lauw-Sim-Zecha family in the early 20th century

The Lauw-Sim-Zecha family is an Indonesian family of the 'Cabang Atas' or the Chinese gentry of the Dutch East Indies (colonial Indonesia). They came to prominence at the start of the nineteenth century as Pachters (revenue farmers), Landheeren (landlords) and Kapitan Cina (government-appointed Chinese headmen) in the colonial capital, Batavia (now Jakarta), and in the hill station of Sukabumi, West Java. The family is of mixed Peranakan Chinese and Indo-Bohemian descent.

Following the Indonesian revolution (1945-1950) and revolutionary leader President Sukarno's nationalization of private assets, the family left Indonesia and is now based mostly overseas.

== Origin and rise ==
Lauw Ho, the founding father of the family, was a prominent pachter or revenue farmer in Batavia between 1845 and 1861, as well as one of the city's wealthiest tycoons. He was also part of the powerful Ngo Ho Tjiang partnership that dominated the opium monopoly in Batavia. He served as Wijkmeester (ward master) of Meester Cornelis, a junior position in the civil bureaucracy.

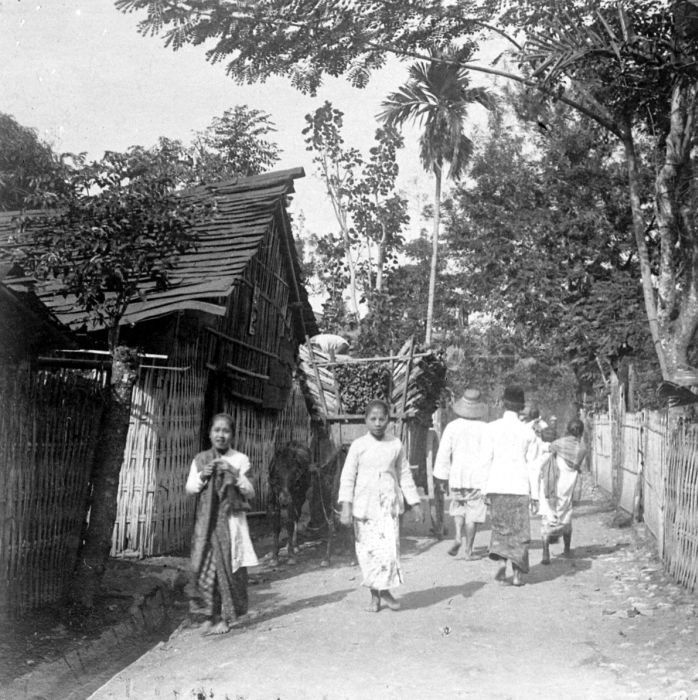
Kampong Gang Zecha was an area in colonial Jakarta named after the Lauw-Sim-Zecha family.

While Lauw Ho failed to secure an elevation to the prestigious Chinese officership, which was a high-ranking civil government post, his two sons – Lauw Tek Kang and Lauw Tek Lok (died in 1887) – were both appointed Luitenants der Chinezen of Meester Cornelis and Bekasi respectively on December 23, 1854. They also became important Landheeren or landlords through their acquisition of significant agricultural landholdings ('particuliere landen') in the Ommelanden or rural hinterland of Batavia, including the estate of Tjimanggis (now Cimanggis). The brothers' acquisition of Chinese lieutenancies and landed estates marked their entry into the ranks of the Cabang Atas.

Luitenant Lauw Tek Lok, who served in office with distinction until his death in 1882, nonetheless caused some consternation among the colonial authorities due to his unconventional, interracial marriage with an Indo-Bohemian woman, Louisa Zecha. On being widowed in 1882, Zecha further scandalized colonial society by marrying her dead husband's former private secretary-turned-magnate Sim Keng Koen, who later had a distinguished government career as the first Kapitein der Chinezen of Sukabumi, a colonial hill station in the Preanger highlands of West Java. As the historian Mely G. Tan notes, the Lauw-Sim-Zecha family lived in a grand style as the premier gentry family of Sukabumi, where most of the extended clan settled down.

== Later history ==
Luitenant Lauw Tek Lok and Louisa Zecha's grandson, Aristide William Lauw-Zecha, became the first Indonesian-born graduate of an American university (Iowa University in 1923), and was a prominent plantation owner. Kapitein Sim Keng Koen and Louisa Zecha's youngest son, Chester Lauw-Sim-Zecha, was also an important community and business leader, as well as a Freemason, in the first half of the twentieth century. The family, however, lost their vast landholdings and assets due to the Indonesian Revolution (1945-1950) and President Sukarno's nationalization of private landed estates in 1952.

In the aftermath of the revolution, many members of the Lauw-Sim-Zecha family, like other scions of the Cabang Atas, left Indonesia and settled overseas. Notable members of the family today include the Malaysian royal Che Engku Chesterina (née Lauw-Sim-Zecha) and her cousin, Adrian Lauw-Zecha, son of A. W. Lauw-Zecha and the founder of Aman Resorts. Lauw-Zecha's son, Ajai, is married to the Singaporean actress Michelle Saram.
