= Rawang (federal constituency) =

Selangor constituency

Defunct federal constituency
- Legislature: Dewan Rakyat
- Constituency created: 1958
- Constituency abolished: 1974
- First contested: 1959
- Last contested: 1969

Rawang was a federal constituency in Selangor, Malaysia, that was represented in the Dewan Rakyat from 1959 to 1974.

The federal constituency was created in the 1974 redistribution and was mandated to return a single member to the Dewan Rakyat under the first past the post voting system.

== History ==
It was abolished in 1974 when it was redistributed.

=== Representation history ===
Members of Parliament for Rawang
Parliament	No	Years	Member	Party	Vote Share
Constituency created from Ulu Selangor
Parliament of the Federation of Malaya
1st	P068	1959-1963	Liu Yoong Peng (刘云鹏)	SF (Lab)	6,143; 57.01%
Parliament of Malaysia
1st	P068	1963-1964	Liu Yoong Peng (刘云鹏)	SF (Lab)	6,143; 57.01%
2nd	P068	1964-1969	Tunku Abdullah Tuanku Abdul Rahman (تونكو عبدالله توانكو عبدالرحمن)	Alliance (UMNO)	9,935; 67.47%
		1969-1971	Parliament was suspended		
3rd	P068	1971-1973	Tunku Abdullah Tuanku Abdul Rahman (تونكو عبدالله توانكو عبدالرحمن)	Alliance (UMNO)	8,260; 50.77%
3rd	P068	1973-1974	Tunku Abdullah Tuanku Abdul Rahman (تونكو عبدالله توانكو عبدالرحمن)	BN (UMNO)	8,260; 50.77%
Constituency abolished split into Ulu Selangor, Shah Alam and Selayang

=== State constituency ===
Parliamentary constituency	State constituency						
Parliamentary constituency	1955–59*	1959–1974	1974–1986	1986–1995	1995–2004	2004–2018	2018–present
Rawang		Kuang					
Rawang		Serendah					

=== Historical boundaries ===
State Constituency	Area
State Constituency	1959
Kuang	Batu Arang; Kundang; Ladang Effingham; Paya Jaras; Subang
Serendah	Batang Berjuntai; Rawang; Serendah; Sungai Choh; Taman Templer

== Election results ==
Malaysian general election, 1969
Party	Candidate	Votes	%	∆%
Alliance	Tunku Abdullah Tuanku Abdul Rahman	8,260	50.77	▼16.70
GERAKAN	G. T. Rajah	8,010	49.23	▲49.23
Total valid votes		16,270	100.00	
Total rejected ballots		1,251		
Unreturned ballots		0		
Turnout		17,521	70.75	▼6.35
Registered electors		24,765		
Majority		250	1.54	▼33.40
Alliance hold		Swing		

Malaysian general election, 1964
Party	Candidate	Votes	%	∆%
Alliance	Tunku Abdullah Tuanku Abdul Rahman	9,935	67.47	▲10.46
Socialist Front	Lee Chi Kit	4,789	32.53	▼24.48
Total valid votes		14,724	100.00	
Total rejected ballots		659		
Unreturned ballots		0		
Turnout		15,383	77.10	
Registered electors		19,951		
Majority		5,146	34.94	▲11.84
Alliance gain from Socialist Front		Swing		?

Malayan general election, 1959
Party	Candidate	Votes	%
Socialist Front	Liu Yoong Peng	6,143	57.01
Alliance	Abdul Karim Kassim	3,654	33.91
Independent	Borhan Abdul Majid	978	9.08
Total valid votes		10,775	100.00
Total rejected ballots		118	
Unreturned ballots		0	
Turnout		10,893	75.76
Registered electors		14,378	
Majority		2,489	23.10
This was a new constituency created.
