= Lauw Tek Lok =

Lauw Tek Lok, Luitenant der Chinezen

Luitenant der Chinezen of Bekasi
- In office 1854 – 1882 (died in office)
- Preceded by: New creation
- Succeeded by: Luitenant Tan Kang Ie
- Constituency: Bekasi

Personal details
- Born: Batavia, Dutch East Indies
- Died: 1882 Meester Cornelis, Dutch East Indies
- Spouse: Louisa Zecha
- Relations: Lauw Ho(father); Aristide William Lauw Zecha (grandson); Alwin Lauw Zecha (great-grandson); Adrian Lauw Zecha (great-grandson)
- Children: Emilia Lauw Joe Nio (daughter); Cornelia Sebastiana Lauw Gobang (daughter); Christiaan Lauw Tjeng Soey (son); Maximilian Theodoor Lauw Tjeng Kiet (son); Louis Lauw Tjeng Bie (son)
- Occupation: Mandarin
- Known for: Role as the first Luitenant der Chinezen of Bekasi and a leading, colonial landlord

Lauw Tek Lok, Luitenant der Chinezen (died in Meester Cornelis in 1882) was a high-ranking government official and landlord in Batavia, Dutch East Indies, and a member of the Lauw-Sim-Zecha family, part of Java’s Cabang Atas gentry. He is remembered today for his long tenure as Luitenant der Chinezen (or government-appointed head mandarin) of Bekasi, and for his interracial marriage with Louisa Zecha.

Born in Batavia, Lauw Tek Lok was the son of the early nineteenth-century tycoon Lauw Ho (died in 1863), part of the powerful Ngo Ho Tjiang opium partnership. His father was an important revenue farmer, and served as Wijkmeester (ward master) of Meester Cornelis. The younger Lauw became one of the most important landlords ('Landheeren') in Batavia with significant agricultural landholdings ('particuliere landen') in the city's Ommelanden (the then rural hinterland of Batavia), including the estate of Cimanggis.

Lauw was appointed on December 23, 1854 to the newly created government post of Luitenant der Chinezen of Bekasi, a civil administrative position he would keep until his death in 1882. At the same time, his brother Lauw Tek Kang was also raised to the post of Luitenant der Chinezen of Meester Cornelis. As Luitenant, Lauw Tek Lok played a significant role in the Dutch colonial development of Bekasi and its surrounding region. On his death in 1882, Lauw was succeeded as Luitenant der Chinezen of Bekasi by another local landlord and his son-in-law, Tan Kang Ie.

Despite his satisfactory records as a colonial administrator, Lauw caused some consternation among the colonial authorities due to his unconventional and interracial marriage with an Indo woman of Bohemian descent, Louisa Zecha. Together, they became the ancestors of the prominent Lauw-Sim-Zecha family, and were the great-grandparents of Adrian Lauw Zecha, founder of Aman Resorts.

Government offices
Preceded by New creation	Luitenant der Chinezen of Bekasi; 1854–1882	Succeeded by Luitenant Tan Kang Ie
