= Matraman =

District in Jakarta, Indonesia

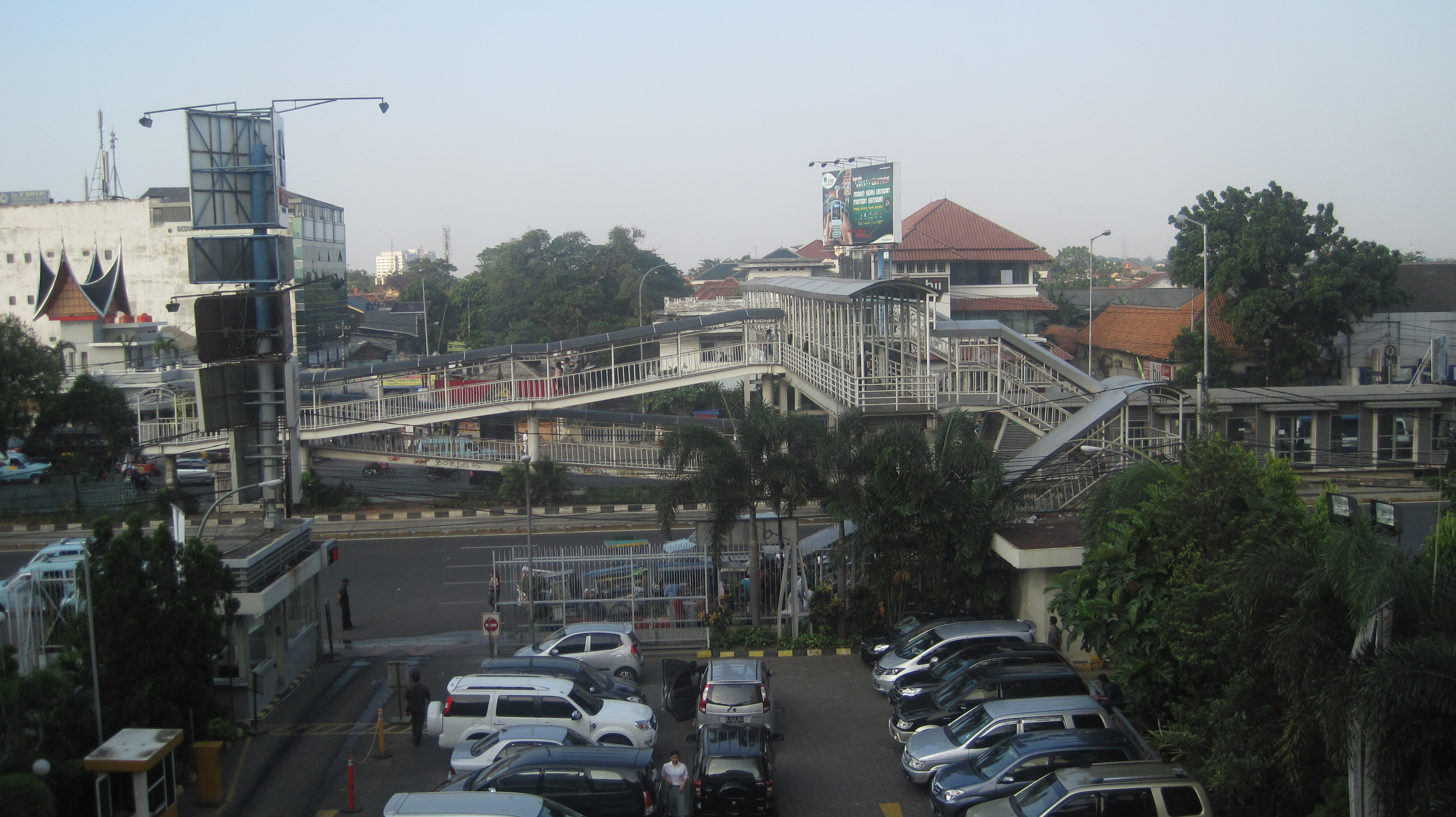
Matraman Raya Road

The district, right. Click for broader map and to enable varied magnification.

Matraman is a district (kecamatan) of East Jakarta, Indonesia. Matraman is the smallest district of East Jakarta. The boundaries of Matraman are: Bekasi Barat Raya Road to the south, Prof Wiyoto Witono MSc Highway to the east, Pramuka Road to the north, and Ciliwung River to the west.

== Kelurahan (Administrative Villages) ==
The district of Matraman is divided into six Kelurahan ("Administrative Villages"):

- Pisangan Baru - area code 13110
- Utan Kayu Selatan - area code 13120
- Utan Kayu Utara - area code 13120
- Kayu Manis - area code 13130
- Pal Meriam - area code 13140
- Kebon Manggis - area code 13150

== List of important places ==
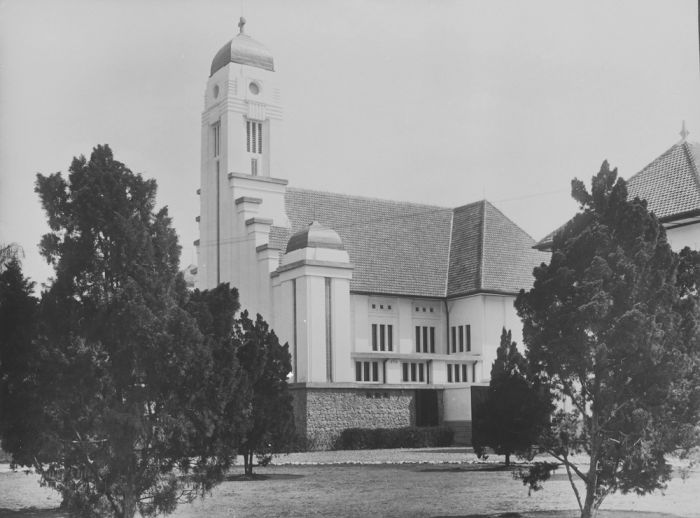
St Joseph Church, Matraman

- Gereja St Yosep ("St Joseph Church")
- Jatinegara Station
- Pasar Burung Pramuka (Pramuka Birds Market)
- Pasar Pramuka (Pramuka Market), medicines wholesale market
- Gramedia Matraman Bookstores
- Matraman Station
