= Paseban =

- Administrative village
- Interactive map of Paseban
- Country: Indonesia
- Province: DKI Jakarta
- Administrative city: Central Jakarta
- District: Senen
- Postal code: 10440

Paseban is an administrative village (kelurahan in Indonesian) at the Senen subdistrict, Central Jakarta. Its borders are defined by:

- Kramat administrative village in the north
- Kenari administrative village in the west
- Johar Baru administrative village in the east
- Rawasari administrative village in the south

The zip code of this administrative village is 10440.

== Etymology ==
The name Paseban is derived from the Javanese word 'paséban', which means 'audience hall'.
