= Jatinegara =

District in East Jakarta, Indonesia

Jatinegara Historically: Meester Cornelis (in Dutch, Javindo, and Petjo)
- Kecamatan (lit. 'district')
- Jatinegara

Other transcription(s)
  - Sundanese: ᮏᮒᮤᮔᮌᮛ; Jatinagara (Sundanese latinization)
  - Javanese: ꦗꦠꦶꦤꦼꦒꦫ; Jatinêgara (Javanese latinization)
  - Chinese: 干冬墟 (Hanzi); Gàn dōng xū (Pinyin); Kan-tang-khu (Pe̍h-ōe-jī)
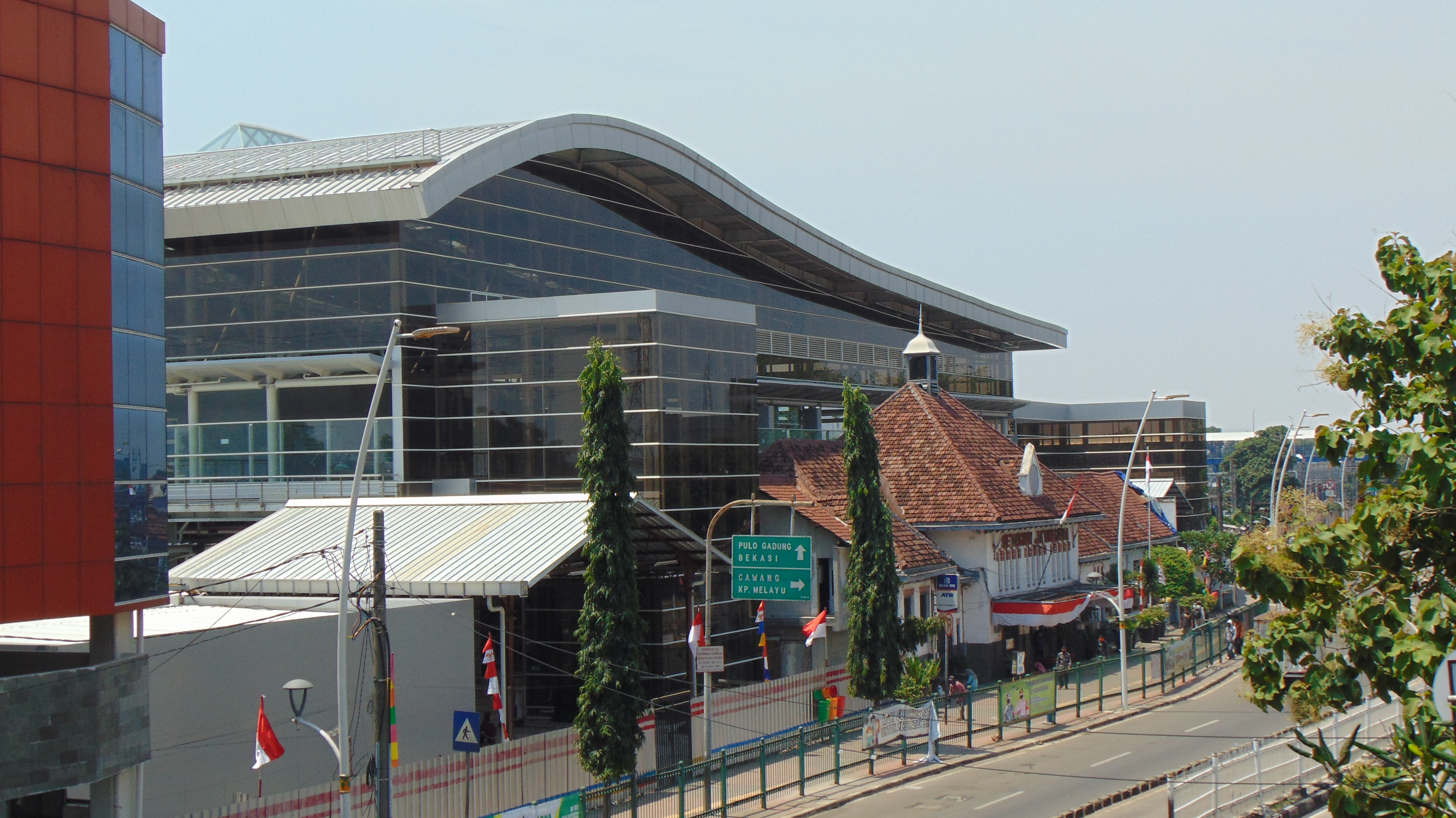
- Jatinegara Station, gateway to Jatinegara.
- Interactive map of Jatinegara
- Coordinates: 6°14′0″S 106°53′0″E
- Country: Indonesia
- Province: Jakarta
- Administrative city: East Jakarta

Area
  - Total: 10.64 km^{2} (4.11 sq mi)

Population
  - Total: 263,706
  - Density: 24,780/km^{2} (64,190/sq mi)
- Postal code: 133XX and 134XX

Jatinegara (originally known as Meester Cornelis or Meester/Mester for short) is one of the districts (Indonesian: kecamatan) of the administrative city of East Jakarta, Indonesia. The name also refers to the larger, historic area of the colonial town of Meester Cornelis. Established in the 17th century, Jatinegara is one of the oldest areas in Jakarta, and contains a number of buildings from the colonial period.

The area is historically known for its cosmopolitan character, dominated formerly by indigenous Christians from the so-called Outer Islands, but also with sizeable Chinese and Arab communities (Vreemde Oosterlingen or 'foreign orientals'). Jatinegara railway station, one of the biggest railway stations in Jakarta, is located on the boundary between the districts of Jatinegara and Matraman.

Another Jatinegara, an administrative village in Cakung, has no known historic connection to Jatinegara in Jakarta.

== History ==
=== Pre-colonial era ===
The name Jatinegara is derived from Jatina Nagara, Sundanese for "the might of the state", symbolizing the resistance of the princes of Banten in their fight against the Dutch East India Company. Local lore claims that, sometime in the 17th century, Jatinegara became home to a settlement of Bantenese princes and their followers.

=== Early colonial period ===
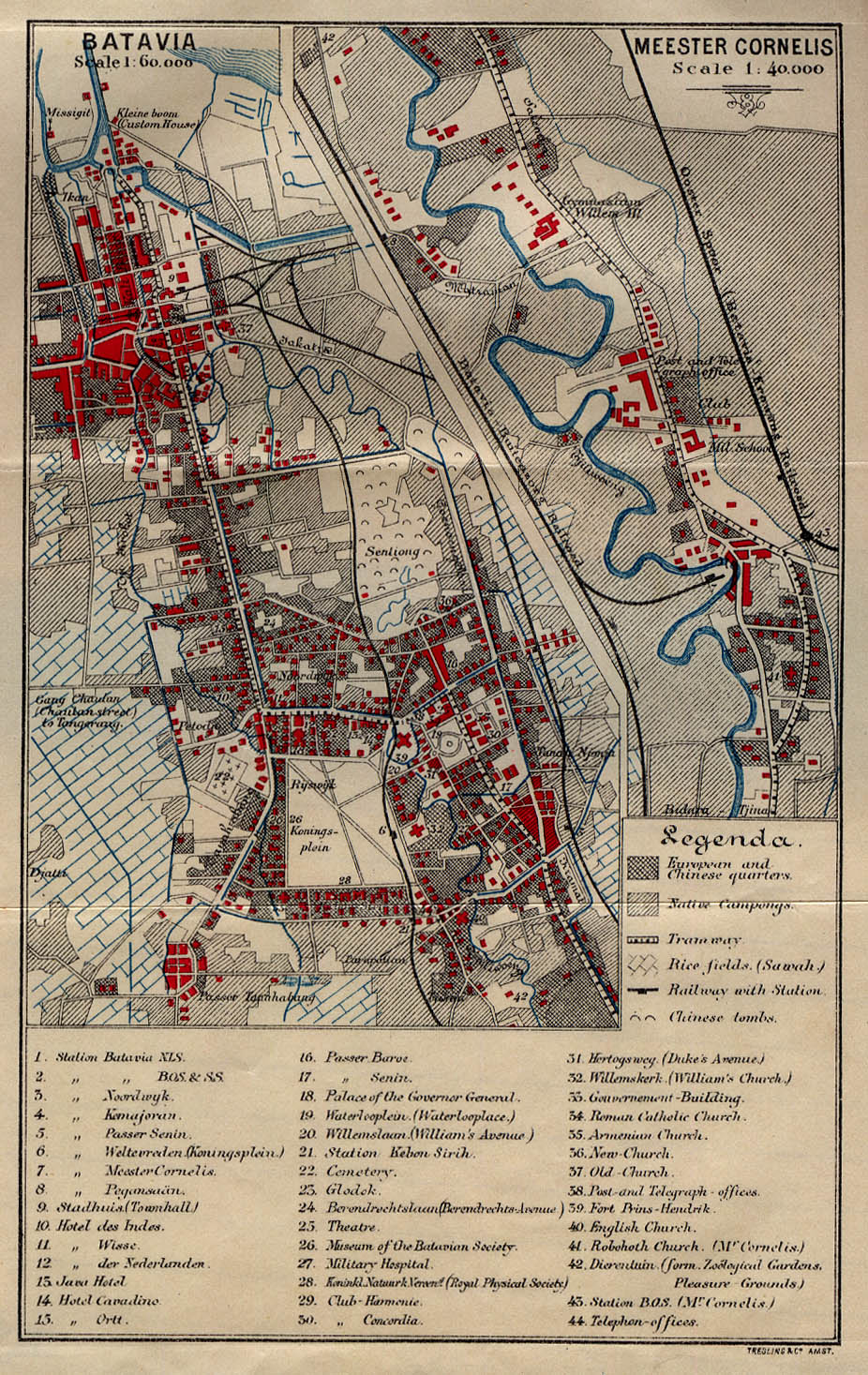
Batavia map of Meester Cornelis

During the Dutch colonial period, the area was renamed Meester Cornelis, after Cornelis Senen. He was one of the most celebrated Malay-speaking (Calvinist) preachers and schoolmasters of his time. He was the son of an indigenous Christian who had been resettled by the Company in Lontor, one of the (Banda Islands). In 1656, Senen was granted a private estate (particuliere land) to the east of Ciliwung, with total area of 5 square kilometers, about 12 km southeast of the fort of Batavia. As a landlord (Landheer), he was addressed by the old Dutch honorific Meester or master. The land was harvested for timber and used mainly for agriculture. Cornelis Senen died in 1661, and gave his name to his old estate until it was renamed after Indonesian independence.

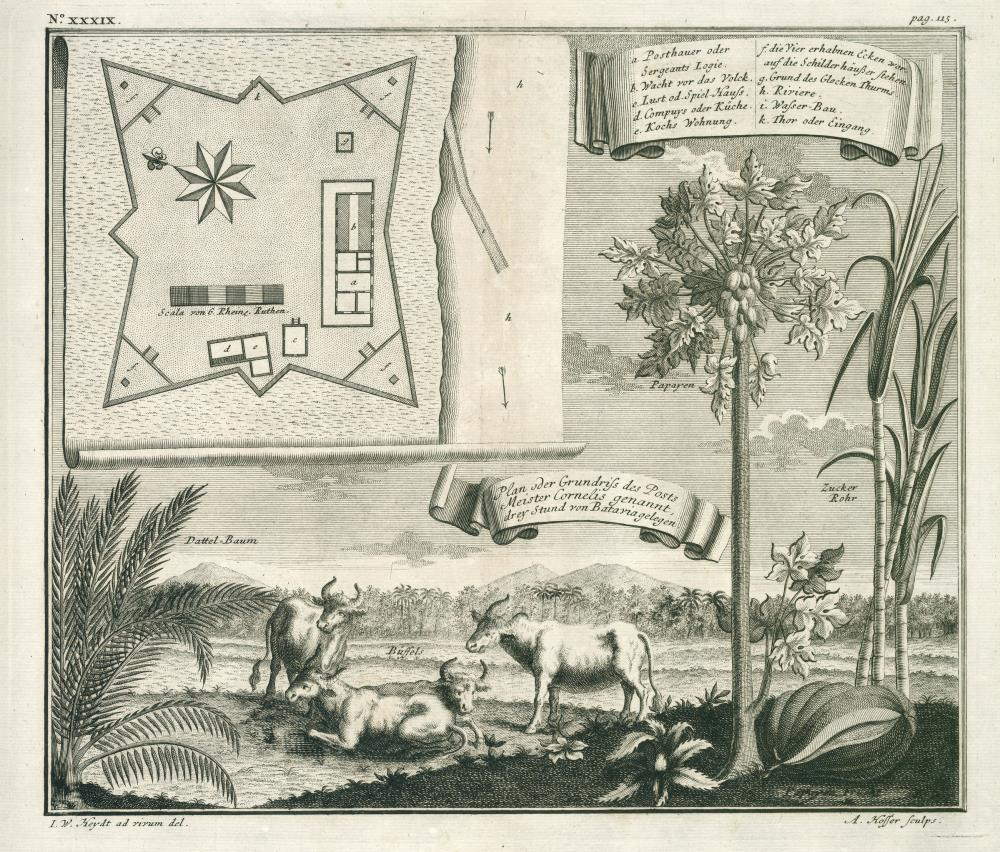
The post Meester Cornelis near Ciliwung

During the 18th century, Meester Cornelis was a military district with residential areas, wide roads, and a semi-rural character. A buffalo market, known for its "Thursday Market", was built in the vicinity in 1706. A fort was built in 1734. The commander of the fort established entertainment facilities around the fort, including a playhouse. In 1746, an encampment for soldiers with malaria was built in this area because of its higher altitude and drier air.

An artillery school was established in 1805. In 1810, the Napoleonic Governor-General of the Dutch East Indies, Herman Willem Daendels (1762–1818) designated Meester Cornelis as Batavia's line of defence against a possible, British attack. The defence system was centered on the Meester Cornelis fort. The British attacked in 1811, won and installed a temporary British administration in the Dutch East Indies. In 1820, under the newly restored Dutch government, the fort was transformed into a prison.

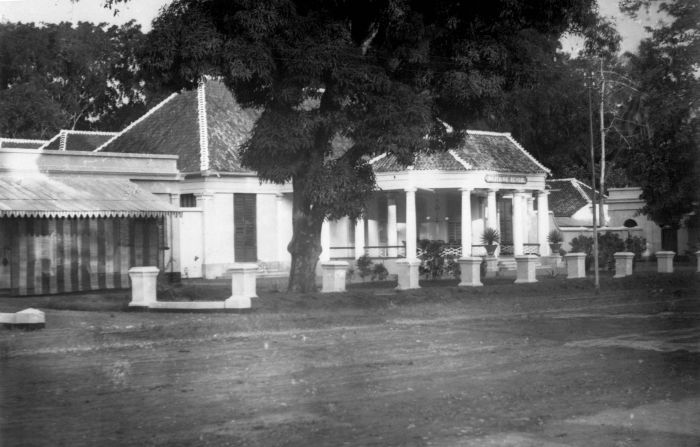
Meester Cornelis Military School

Meester Cornelis Military School was opened in 1852 and closed in 1892. While not the first military school in the Dutch East Indies, it was certainly the most successful. One third of the students were born in the colony; the majority came from the Netherlands; and one tenth were other Europeans, mostly from Germany. Most students were from the middle class. The school was later closed down because of financial problems: only one in three students graduated, so the costs per student were unacceptably high.

=== Modern colonial period ===
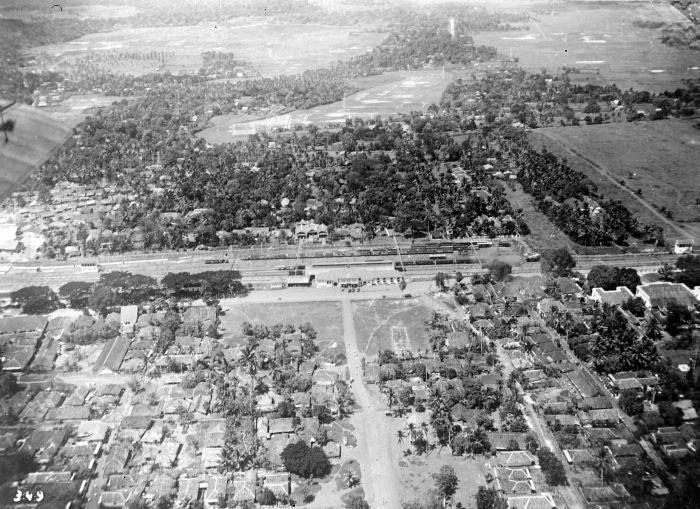
Bird's-eye view of the center of the municipal of Meester Cornelis around its main station.

Beginning in the 19th century, Jatinegara became one of Batavia's key transportation nodes. A horse tram was established in 1869 connecting Meester Cornelis to Kota Intan (the "Diamond City", the oldest Dutch settlement in Jakarta), via Harmoni. On January 31, 1873, the Dutch East Indian Railway Company established a railway line from Meester Cornelis to Buitenzorg (now Bogor). This line converged on the Meester Cornelis Station (now Jatinegara Station), one of the four oldest railway stations in Jakarta. On April 6, 1875, a railway connection between Meester Cornelis and Batavia was inaugurated, thus connecting the old city of Batavia with Buitenzorg. In the 1880s, the Batavian Eastern Railway Company (BOS) also constructed a 35-mile (56 km) route linking Batavia with Karawang via Meester Cornelis and Bekasi.

In 1881, a steam-powered tram was established between Kota Intan and Meester Cornelis through Glodok, Harmoni, Pasar Baru, Pasar Senen and Kramat. On 6 April 1925, electric trains operated for the first time, serving a 15.6 km route from Port Tanjung Priok to Jatinegara and 2.6 km route from Jatinegara to Manggarai. The numerous public transportation lines servicing Meester Cornelis indicated the significance of this area at that time.

Meester was, at first, governed by an Assistant-Resident, overseeing a traditional bureaucracy with separate administrations for the Europeans, 'Foreign Orientals' and indigenous population of the territory. In 1905, Meester Cornelis was chartered as a town with its own council, similar to Batavia; then sometime after 1922, a Mayor replaced the Assistant-Resident. The Mayors were M. Doorninck (1922–1932) and G. Pitlo (1933–1935).

Being strategically located, Meester Cornelis also became a center for entertainment and leisure. One of Jakarta's earliest cinemas, the relatively modest Centrale Cinema, was opened in 1912 on what is now Jalan Matraman. The cinema would continue to be called Centrale up until the early 1950s, but then underwent a name change to Djaja Cinema (probably during the Sukarno period). The cinema was demolished sometime in the 1980s.

In 1935, Meester Cornelis was officially transferred to the administration of the government of Batavia.

=== Japanese occupation and Indonesian independence ===
Under the Japanese occupation, the name Meester Cornelis was deemed too Dutch, and was changed to Djatinegara. The name has been retained to this day, though older residents, certain transportation routes and one of the local markets still use the old, colonial name 'Meester'.

== Subdistricts ==
Jatinegara subdistrics

Jatinegara is one of the districts of East Jakarta. The boundaries of Jatinegara are Bekasi Barat Raya - Bekasi Timur Raya - Jalan I. Gusti Ngurah Rai to the north, Kali Sunter to the east, Kali Malang canal - Jakarta–Cikampek Toll Road to the south, and Ciliwung River to the west.

The district of Jatinegara is divided into eight kelurahan or subdistricts:

Name	Area/postal code
Bali Mester	13310
Kampung Melayu	13320
Bidaracina	13330
Cipinang Cempedak	13340
Rawa Bunga	13350
Cipinang Besar Utara	13410
Cipinang Besar Selatan	13410
Cipinang Muara	13420

== List of important places ==
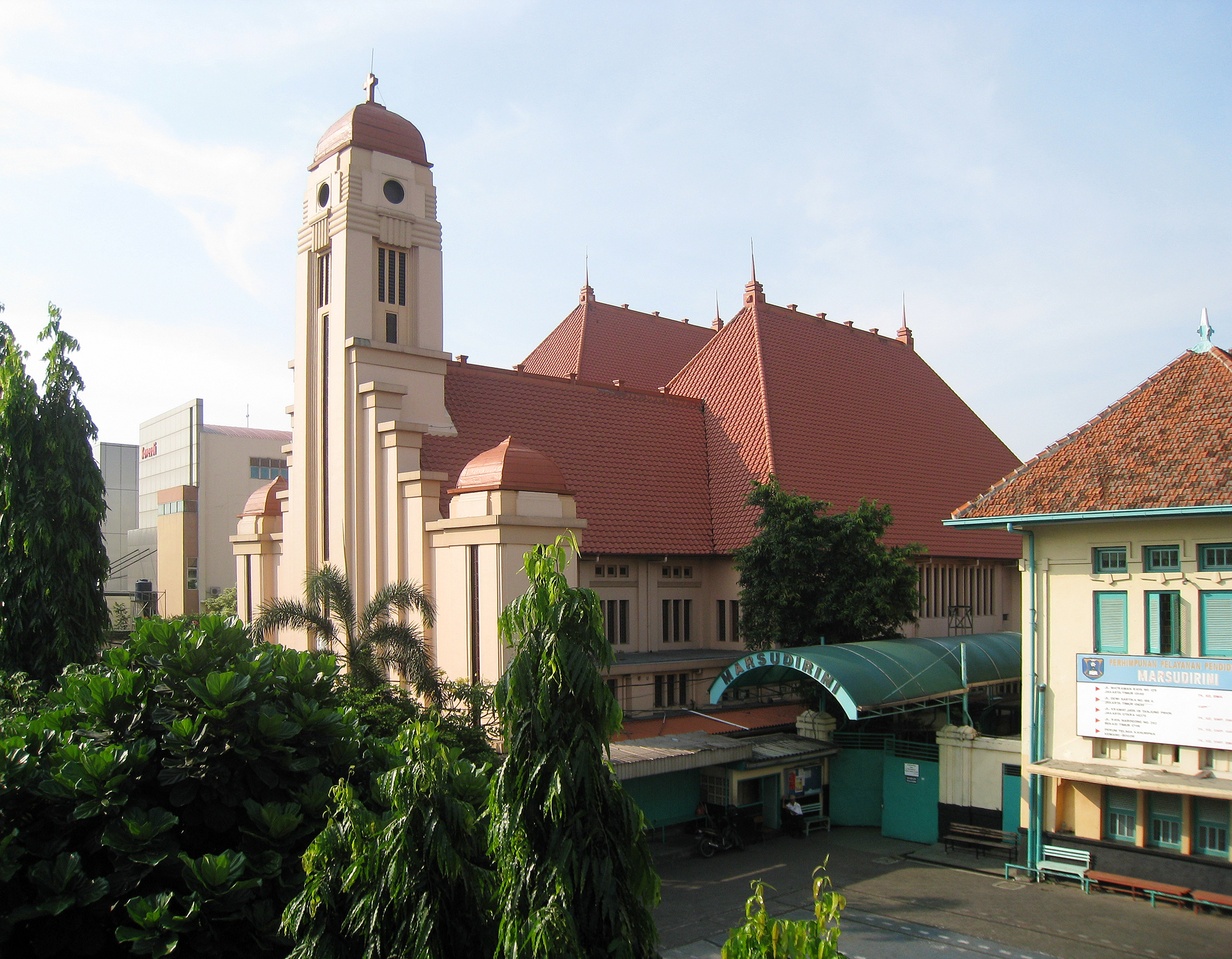
Saint Joseph's Church in Jatinegara.

- Koinonia Church
- Bethesda Church
- St Anthony of Padua Catholic Church
- Fu De Gong Chinese Temple
- Shia Djin Kong Chinese Temple
- Cipinang Besar Cemetery (Chinese Cemetery)
- Jatinegara Regional Market
- Kampung Melayu Terminal
- tvOne headquarters
- Mpu Tantular University
- Gedung Wedana Meester Cornelis
- Pasar Rawa Bening
- Pasar Mester
- Pasar Induk Beras Cipinang
- Jatinegara railway station

== Notable residents ==
- Lauw Ho, Wijkmeester of Meester Cornelis: a revenue farmer and an ancestor of the Lauw-Sim-Zecha family
- Lauw Tek Kang, Luitenant der Chinezen of Meester Cornelis: Lauw Ho's son, landlord and bureaucrat

== Other ==
The Meester-Cornelis (H5) meteorite fell in Jakarta Raya, Indonesia, on 2 June 1915. A total mass of 24.75 kg was recovered.

== Cited works ==
- Mahdi, Mahdi (2007). Malay Words and Malay Things - Lexical Souvernirs from an Exotic Archipelago in German Publications before 1700. Wiesbaden: Harrassowitz Verlag. ISBN 9783447054928.
- Merrillees, Scott (2015). Jakarta: Portraits of a Capital 1950-1980. Jakarta: Equinox Publishing. ISBN 9786028397308.
