= CNA Center =

CNA Center may refer to one of the following buildings that has housed the headquarters of CNA Financial Corporation:

- 151 North Franklin, called CNA Center starting in 2018
- 333 South Wabash, called CNA Center until 2018

== See also ==
- List of tallest buildings in Chicago
