= SHVO =

US real estate development company

- Industry: Real estate development
- Founded: 2004
- Founder: Michael Shvo
- Headquarters: New York City
- Key people: Michael Shvo, Chairman & CEO
- Website: www.shvo.com

SHVO is a real estate investment and development company based in New York City with offices in Miami, San Francisco, Los Angeles, and Chicago. It purchases and develops high end properties in the United States and internationally. SHVO was founded by Michael Shvo who serves as the company chairman and CEO.

== History ==
=== 2004-2012; Early history ===
SHVO was founded by real estate developer Michael Shvo in 2004. Prior to that time, Shvo worked as a real-estate broker with Douglas Elliman, the largest brokerage in New York. In 2003, at the age of 30, he achieved more than $300 million in sales from more than 400 deals, becoming the firm's top broker.

Through 2008, SHVO performed $15 billion in real estate transactions worldwide, including Nurai, a private island off the coast of Abu Dhabi. Additional developments in New York included the Bryant Park Tower, The Lumiere on 53rd Street in Manhattan, Gramercy Starck designed by Philippe Starck, Jade by Jade Jagger, Fultonhaus, as well as Amangiri in Utah and Nizuc in Mexico. Between 2008 and 2013, Michael Shvo took a break from real estate to focus on art.

=== 2013 to 2024 - Growth ===
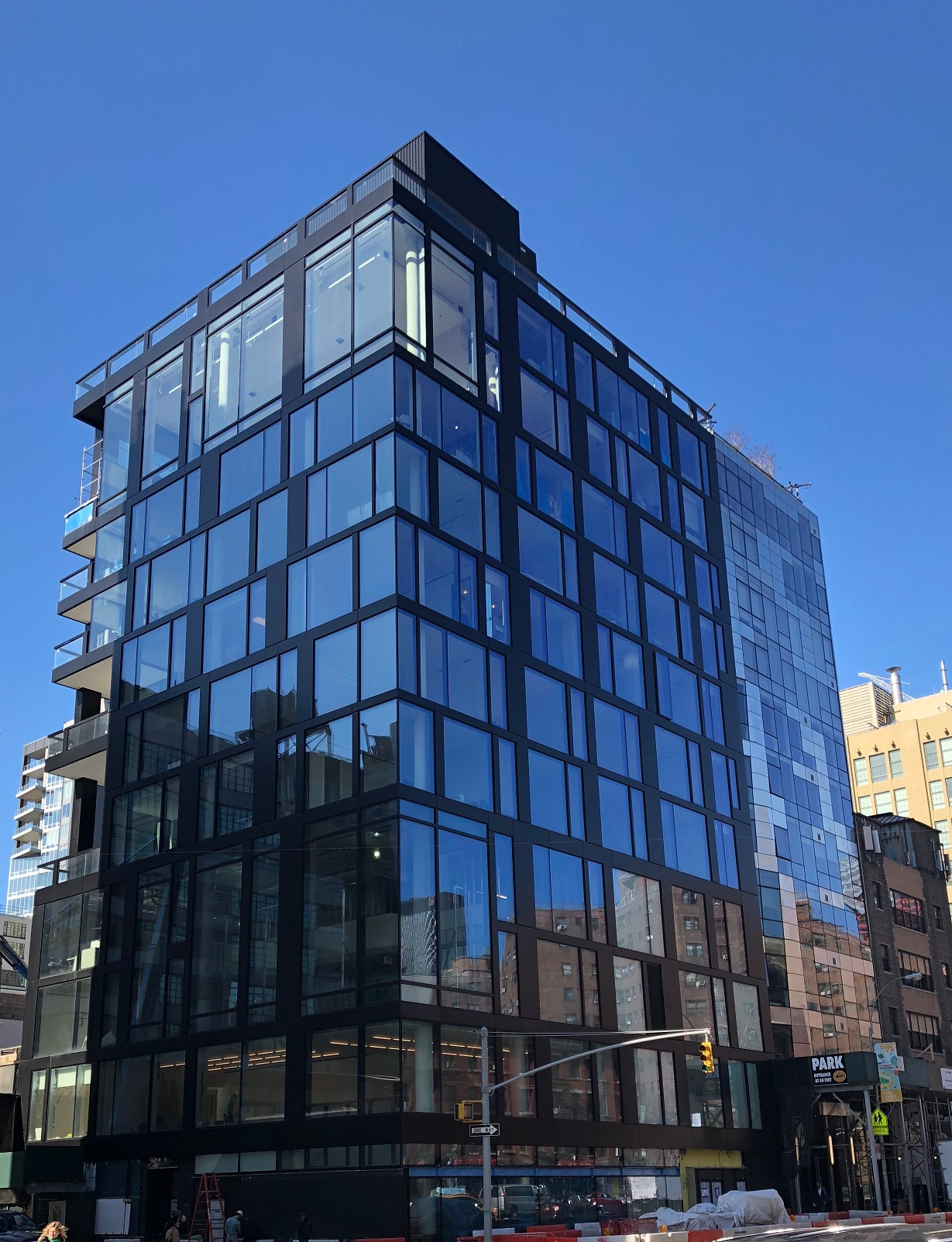
The Getty Building in 2018

SHVO did not restart developments until 2013, initially purchasing a Getty Oil gas station at the corner of 10th Avenue and 24th Street in West Chelsea, Manhattan. It paid $23.5 million for the property which was a record price per buildable square foot in Manhattan. Prior to the development of the property, Michael Shvo turned the former gas station into a public art space. The site was then developed into a high-end luxury condominium named the Getty Building.

In early 2014, SHVO announced the acquisition of eight properties located in SoHo, Manhattan, including parcels located between Varick Street, Broome Street, and Watts Street. It paid $130 million for the site, with plans of turning it into a 30-story residential tower. It was reported by the New York Post that the project would potentially generate more than $800 million in sales. In August 2014, SHVO made a large land acquisition totaling approximately $240 million to develop one of the tallest towers in New York City and the tallest residential tower in Lower Manhattan. The project site is in direct proximity to the new World Trade Center complex, with proposed plans for the tower to rise upwards of 1,356 feet. After his felony conviction in 2018, SHVO was forced to sell his stake in the property, known as 125 Greenwich.

In January 2015, SHVO went into contract to acquire an island, Matt Lowe's Cay, in Abacos, Bahamas, comprising 50 acres and seven private beaches. In 2015, it also acquired the majority of the Crown Building located at 57th Street and Fifth Avenue, in partnership with Vladislav Doronin. General Growth Properties and Wharton properties acquired the retail part of the building. The $1.8 billion purchase was one of the largest in New York City real estate history. The property was designed by Warren and Wetmore, architects of the Helmsley Building and Grand Central Terminal. In 2016, it was revealed the property would be developed into an Aman Hotel and 26 apartments that will go by the name of AMAN New York Residences. According to The Real Deal, SHVO was "removed as co-developer" on AMAN New York Residences after his felony conviction.

In 2016, Shvo was indicted on charges that included felony tax fraud and falsifying business records. He pleaded guilty to the charges in 2018, and paid $3.5 million in taxes and penalties.

In 2018, SHVO purchased the office portion of 685 Fifth Avenue, previously the headquarters of Gucci, from General Growth Partners (GGP), in partnership with Deutsche Finance Group, for 135 million dollars. It has since been disclosed that SHVO will be converting the building into ultra-luxury residences branded as the Mandarin Oriental Residences Fifth Avenue. In 2024, SHVO was sued by a buyer at The Mandarin Oriental Residences Fifth Avenue over alleged construction defects.

In 2019, SHVO purchased Miami’s Raleigh Hotel, and the adjacent Richmond and South Seas Hotels, from Tommy Hilfiger along with partners Deutsche Finance America. In May 2023, SHVO announced Rosewood Hotel Group as the hotel operator of the Raleigh after a deal with Cheval Blanc, a luxury hotel group owned by LVMH fell through. Along with the same financial partners, SHVO purchased a property on Wilshire Boulevard for $130 million, which will be developed into the Mandarin Oriental Residences Beverly Hills, and 711 Fifth Avenue, previously the headquarters of The Coca Cola Company in New York, for $937 million. In 2020, SHVO and partners purchased 333 South Wabash known as Big Red in Chicago for $370 million, 530 Broadway in New York’s Soho district for approximately $380 million, and the Transamerica Pyramid in San Francisco for $650 million.

== 2025 - Downfall ==
In 2025, SHVO surrendered their Alton Road mixed-use project in a deed-in-lieu-of-foreclosure to the lender to avoid further legal entanglement. Later in October 2025, SHVO was forced out of ownership and development of SHVO's Raleigh Hotel, project in Miami Beach, after 6 years of stalled planning and funding. A conflict with a German Pension fund was the forefront of the fallout, leading to the $270 million acquisition of the Raleigh site by Nahla Capital.

=== Partial list of projects ===
Year(s)	Project Name	Details
2020	The Transamerica Pyramid San Francisco	At a height over 850 feet, Transamerica Pyramid was built in 1972, serving as commercial and retail building changed hands for the first time in 2020, purchased by SHVO and partners
2020	333 Wabash Chicago (Big Red)	SHVO acquired 333 Wabash in the first quarter of 2020, it’s a commercial building serving as office spaces
2020	530 Broadway	Located at the corner of Broadway and Spring streets in Soho, 530 Broadway was acquired by SHVO in March 2020
2019	711 Fifth Avenue (Coca Cola Building)	Located at 711 Fifth Avenue, known as Coca Cola building, is a commercial space with offices and restaurants
2019	The South Seas & The Richmond Hotels	1751 & 1751 Collins Ave, Miami Beach, FL. Art Deco buildings purchased by SHVO and partners as an addition to Raleigh Hotel project, to create “The Raleigh Masterplan”
2019	Raleigh Hotel (Miami Beach)	1775 Collins Ave, Miami Beach, FL. Art deco building purchased by SHVO and other partners from Tommy Hilfiger in 2019.

== See also ==
- Architecture of New York City
