= 333 South Wabash =

Office skyscraper in Chicago, Illinois

333 South Wabash – The Northern Trust Tower
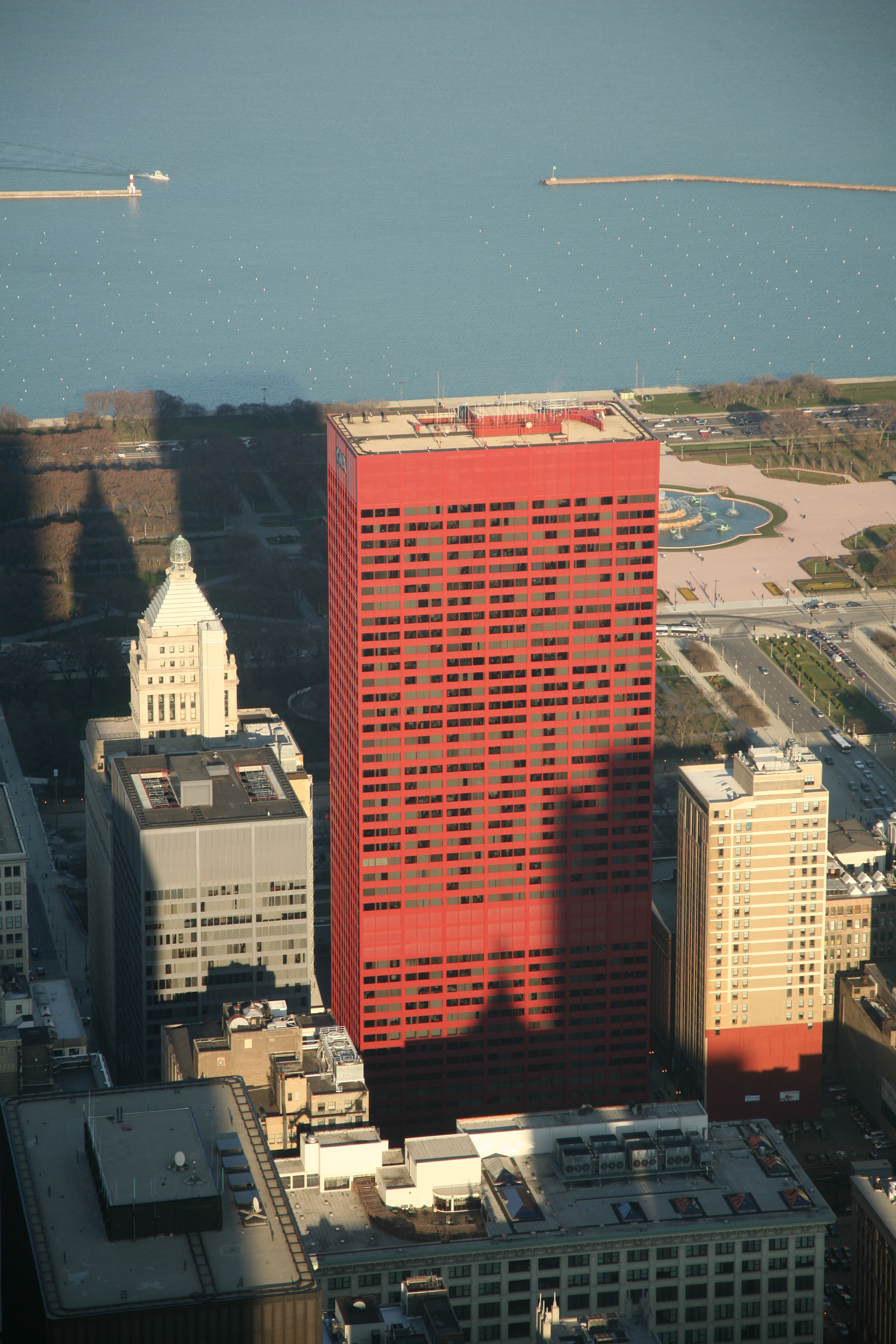
- 333 South Wabash in 2009; view looking east
- Interactive map of the 333 South Wabash – The Northern Trust Tower area

General information
- Status: Completed
- Type: Office
- Architectural style: International Style
- Location: 333 S Wabash Ave; Chicago; IL 60604; United States
- Coordinates: 41°52′38.7″N 87°37′32.3″W
- Construction started: March 1970
- Completed: 1972
- Opening: 1973

Height
- Roof: 600 ft (183 m)
- Top floor: 560 ft (171 m)

Technical details
- Floor count: 44
- Floor area: 1,299,990 sq ft (120,773 m^{2})

Design and construction
- Architect: Graham, Anderson, Probst & White

Website
- https://www.333southwabash.com/

333 South Wabash (formerly CNA Center and Northern Trust Tower; also known as The Red) is a 600-ft (183 m), 44-story skyscraper located at 333 South Wabash Avenue in the central business district of Chicago, Illinois.

== Description ==
333 South Wabash is a simple, rectangular International Style building, but it is unique in that the entire building was painted bright red by Eagle Painting & Maintenance Company, Inc. It was designed by the firm of Graham, Anderson, Probst & White and was completed in 1972.

== Occupants ==
As of 2014, CNA occupied 65 percent of the tower. Other occupants included The Chicago Housing Authority, United Way and Akuna Capital.

In August 2017, Buck and Northern Trust announced an agreement for the bank to lease 465,000 square feet (43,200 m^{2}) of the building. The lease, which includes signage and naming rights, was to consolidate approximately 2,500 to 3,000 Northern Trust workers from several sites around Chicago and take place in 2020.

== History ==
Originally known as Continental Center III, in reference to the original moniker of CNA Financial Corporation, Continental National American Group, both CNA Center (formerly CNA Plaza) and the neighboring CNA Center North (Continental Center II, built in 1962 at 55 East Jackson Blvd.) adjoined and were painted red. The shorter red building was later restored to its original gray tone in 1999. The two buildings remain joined at the second floor: CNA's Conference Center uses space on that floor, but all entrance and egress to it is through CNA Center. The company's previous headquarters from 1943 to 1962 had been Metropolitan Tower (310 South Michigan Avenue, aka Continental Center I).

In 1999, a large fragment of a window fell from the building and killed Ana Bertha Flores who was walking by with her three-year-old child, Viridiana. Windows had been cracking at the building ever since it had been built in 1975 due to thermal stress of uneven heating caused by the building's inset windows. CNA Financial, a property insurance company, later paid $18 million to settle the resultant lawsuit. All of the building's windows were replaced in an expensive retrofit.

333 South Wabash became a Chicago Landmark in 2012. CNA decided to sell the building in 2015 after relocating to 151 North Franklin, and the John Buck Company acquired the building in March 2016 for $108 million. Buck planned to redevelop the building.

In January 2020, a joint venture between Michael Shvo's firm SHVO, Deutsche Finance, and BLG Capital agreed to buy the building for $370 million. Hayden Hall, a food court in the building, opened the same month but closed shortly afterward due to the COVID-19 pandemic. The sale of the building was finalized that August for $376 million. Hayden Hall reopened in 2024. Following a renovation the next year, designed by HOK, 333 South Wabash was rebranded as The Red.

== Lighted window messages ==
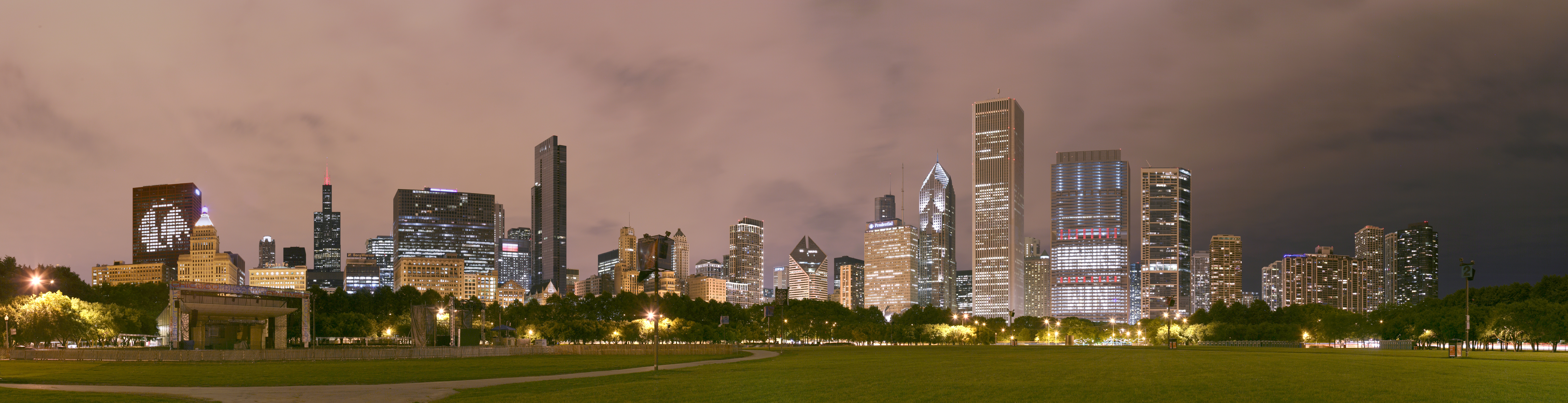
Chicago skyline with the 333 South Wabash (far left) showing the Chicago Blackhawks' logo, the Smurfit-Stone Building saying Go Hawks and the Blue Cross Blue Shield Tower saying Hawks Win the night after the 2009–10 Chicago Blackhawks won the 2010 Stanley Cup Finals, viewed from the Petrillo Music Shell lawn in Grant Park.

Utilizing a combination of lights on/off and 1,600 window blinds open/closed (and sometimes foamboard cutouts), the windows on 333 South Wabash are often used to display lighted window messages, typically denoting holidays, remembrances, and other events denoting Chicago civic pride, such as when the Blackhawks played in and won the 2010 Stanley Cup Finals and when the Cubs made their 2016 World Series run. Building engineers use a computer program to plot which windows need to be lighted to create the proper message.

== Position in Chicago's skyline ==
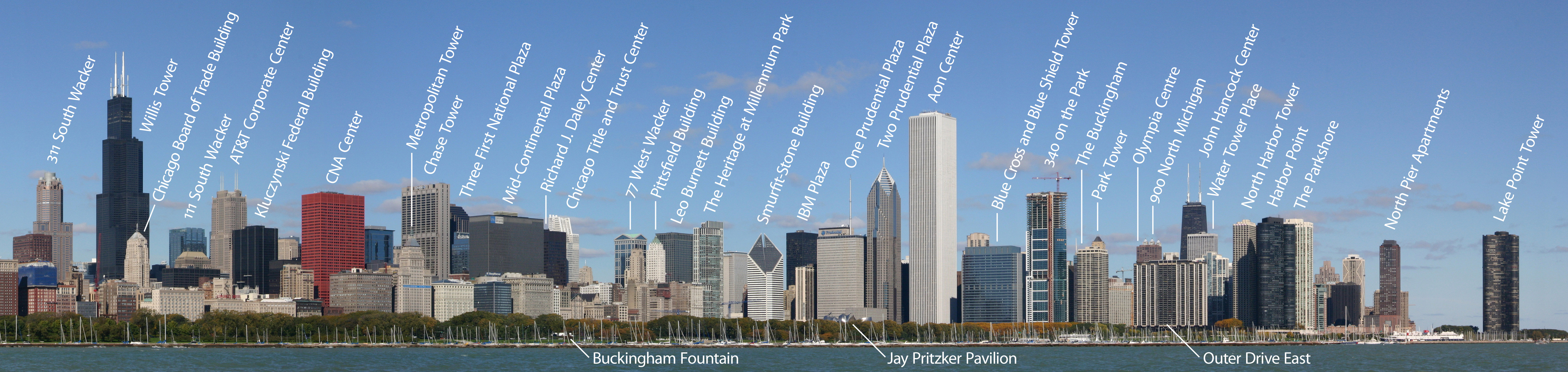

Gallery
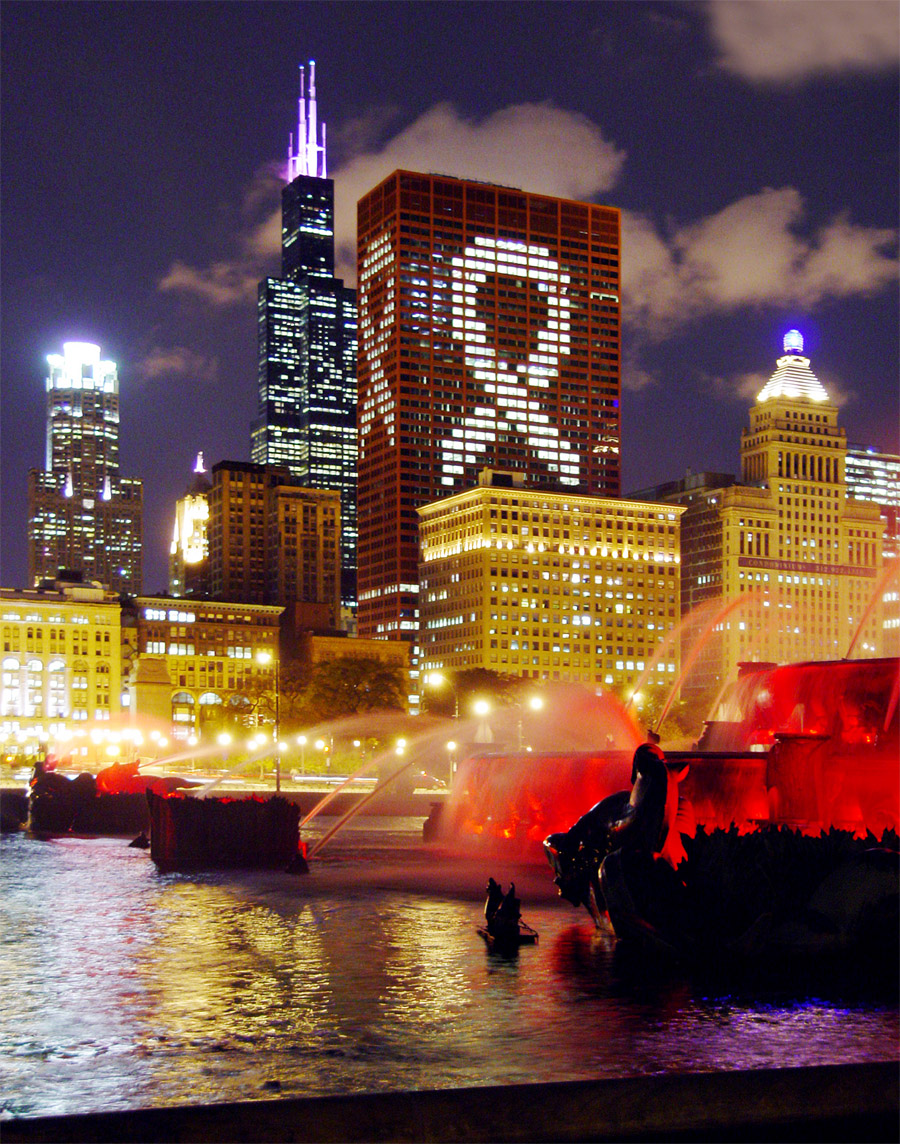
Breast Cancer Awareness Month, October 2005

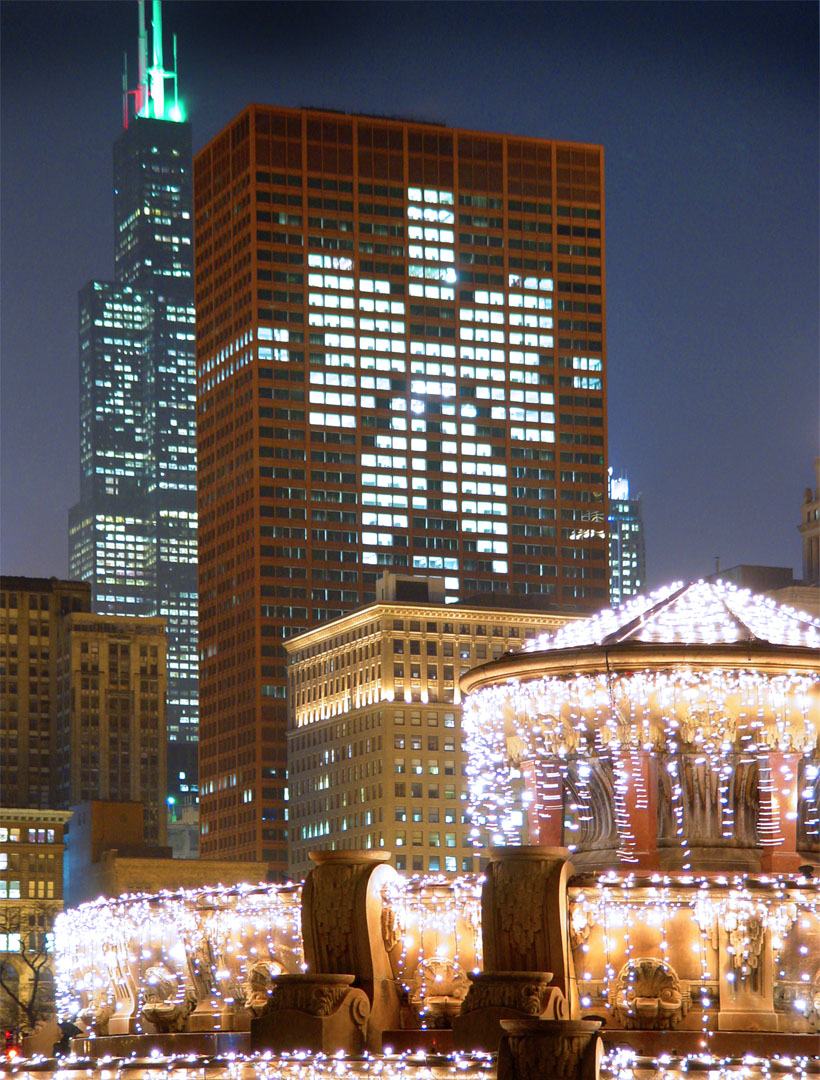
December 2005, "gift" of a wrapped present design reflecting the winter holidays.

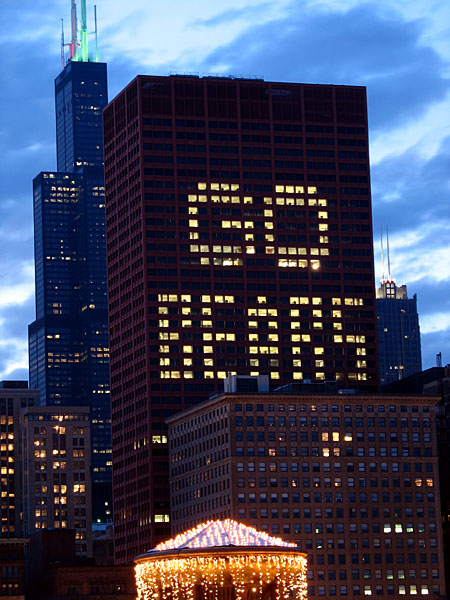
333 South Wabash cheers the Chicago Bears

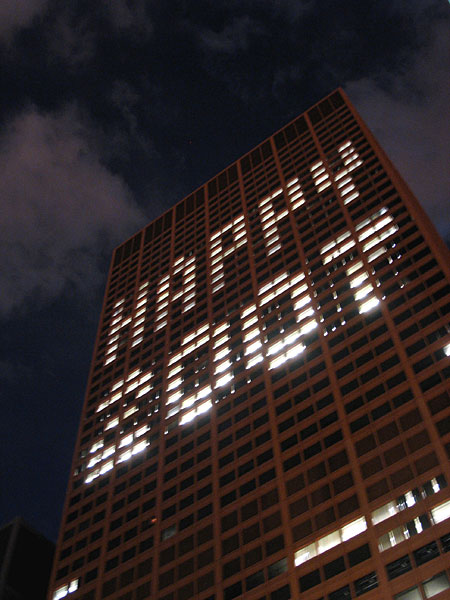
Lighted window message for New Year's Eve 2007

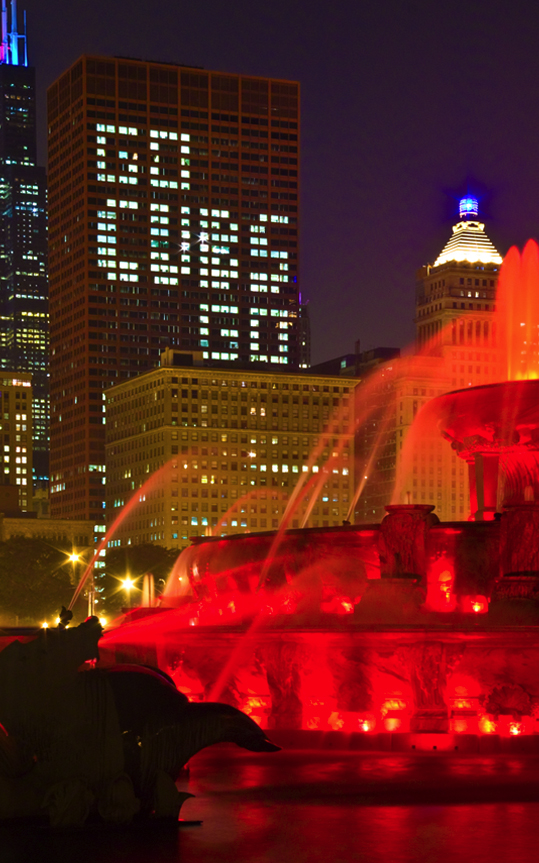
CNA's building with wording formed by office lights through windows "Go Cubs Go".
