= Hill Art Foundation =

Art gallery in Manhattan, New York

Coordinates: 40°44′55″N 74°0′14″W

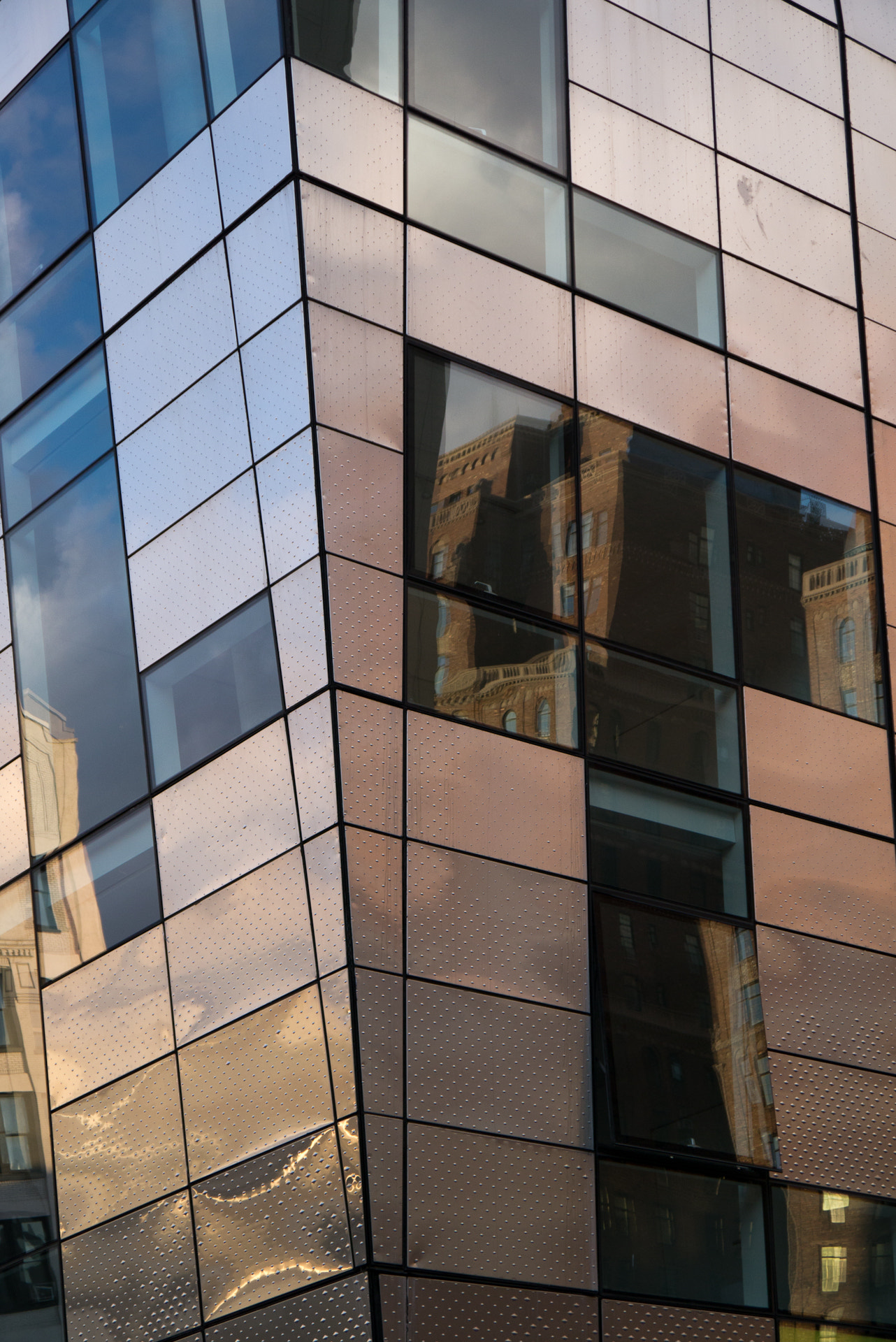
Hill Art Foundation Building, Manhattan

Hill Art Foundation is a public exhibition and education space located in Chelsea, Manhattan, New York City. The foundation, founded by J. Tomilson and Janine Hill, opened to the public in February 2019. Located on 10th Avenue and West 24th Street in Peter Marino's Getty Building, the 650 m^{2} (7,000 sq ft) space exhibits works from the Hill Art Foundation collection as well as collaborative projects with leading artists, collections, and institutions. The Foundation is free and open to the public, and offers educational programming to both New York City high school students and the public at large.

== Architecture ==
The foundation has two main galleries, one of them double-height, overlooking the High Line, and some smaller spaces also designed for showing art.

== Works ==
The Hill Collection focuses on in-depth collecting within four main categories: Renaissance and Baroque bronzes, Old Master paintings, Modern Masters, and Contemporary artists. Works from the Hill Collection have been loaned to prominent museums worldwide, including the 2014 exhibition Renaissance and Baroque Bronzes from the Hill Collection at The Frick Collection which featured Renaissance and Baroque bronzes and a selection of Post-War works from the collection.

In addition to rotating exhibitions of works from the Hill Collection and other domains, select works from the Hill Collection are permanently installed. Drains, a 1990 sculpture in cast pewter by Robert Gober, is installed inset into the walls of the gallery, Untitled, a monumental 2013 sculpture in bronze and copper-plated steel by Christopher Wool is installed on an outdoor terrace, and The Creation and the Expulsion from Paradise, a 1533 series of stained glass panels by Valentin Bousch is installed opposite the windows overlooking West 24th Street.

== Education ==
The Foundation offers three free programs that engage New York City high school students with the visual arts: Teen Curators, Teen Summer Fellows, and HAF educators.
