= Getty Residences =

Getty Building
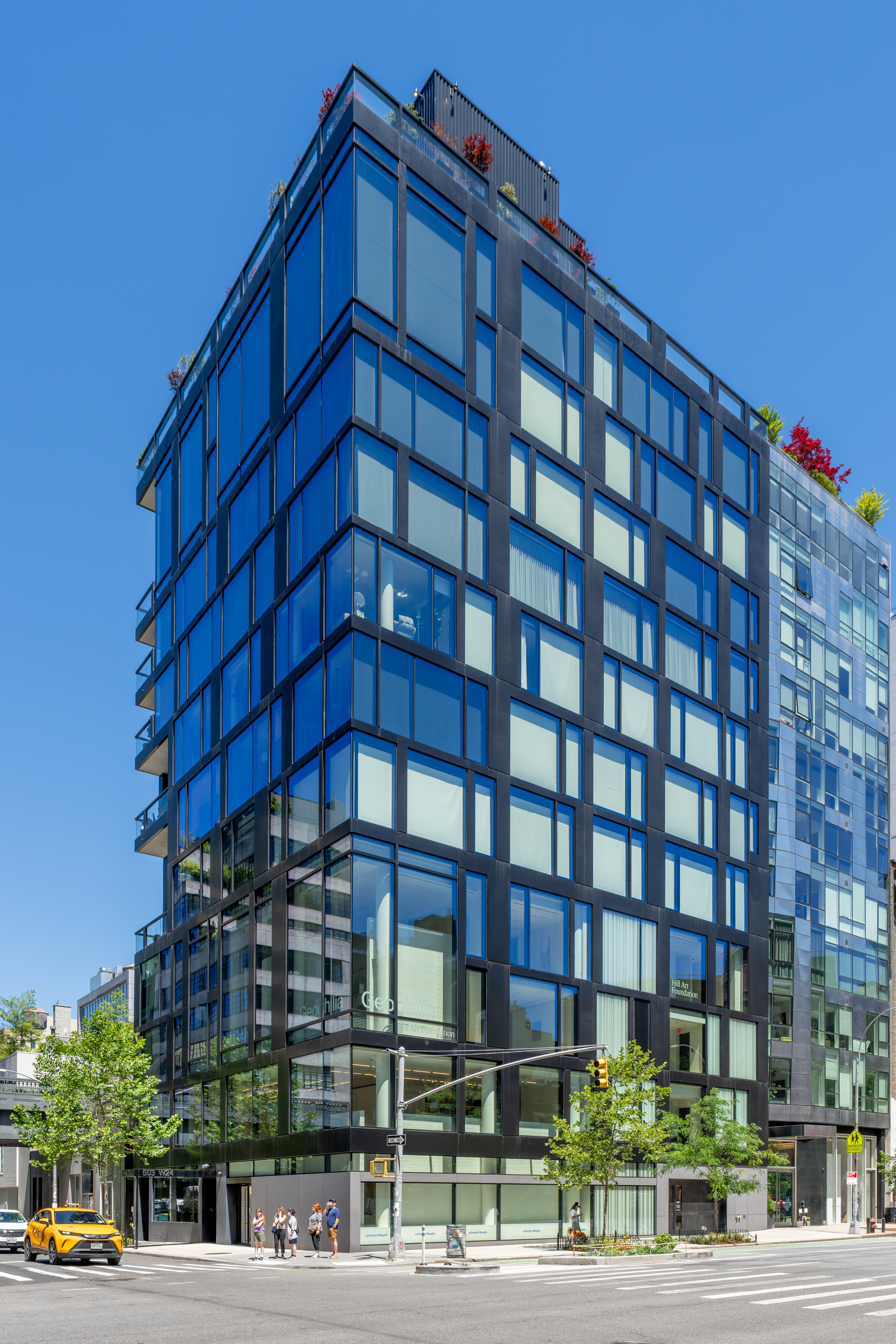
- The Getty Building in 2026
- Interactive map of the Getty Building area

General information
- Type: Condominium
- Location: 503 West 24th Street, Manhattan, New York
- Coordinates: 40°44′55.5″N 74°00′14.2″W
- Groundbreaking: 2013
- Estimated completion: 2018
- Owner: Victor Group

Technical details
- Floor count: 12

Website
- www.shvo.com/portfolio/the-getty/

The Getty Residences (previously known as "Getty Station" or "Sheep Station") is a high-end luxury condominium located on the corner of 10th Avenue and 24th Street in Chelsea, Manhattan, New York City. It was formerly a Getty Oil gas station and was turned into a public art display (known as "Sheep Station") in 2013 after being purchased by developer Michael Shvo. It featured a display of Lalanne mouton sculptures created by François-Xavier Lalanne which were from Shvo's personal collection. It was also considered the largest display of such sculptures by Lalanne.

== Sheep Station ==
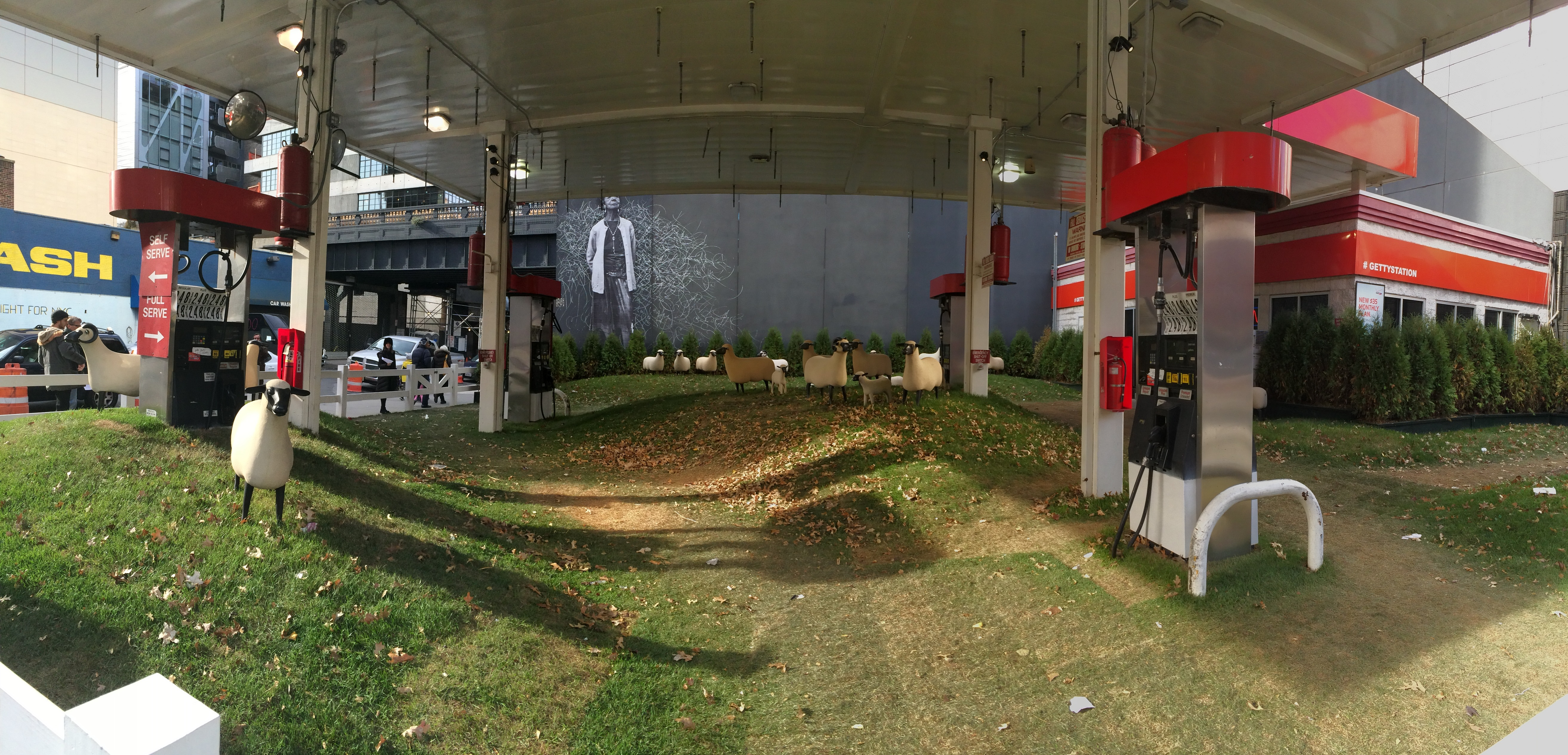
Getty Station in Manhattan in 2014

The display was at the corner of 10th Avenue and 24th Street in Manhattan at the site of what was previously a Getty Oil gas station. Shvo purchased the property in 2013 for $23.5 million with plans to turn it into a high end luxury condominiums.

Shvo teamed up with Paul Kasmin Gallery for the installation. It began with small trees on the property before teaming up with François-Xavier Lalanne (who was represented by the gallery). Permission to use Lalanne's work was obtained from his widow, Claude Lalanne.

15 of the sheep on display were from Shvo's personal collection with the remaining supplied by Kasmin. The grounds were transformed into a meadow by using gravel and grass, with the sheep positioned as if they were grazing in the meadow.

== The Getty Residences ==
The site was later developed into a high-end luxury condominium named The Getty Residences, with Peter Marino designated as the architect for both the interior and exterior of the project.

The property is the home of the Lehmann Maupin gallery as well as a private museum owned by J. Tomilson Hill. Maupin paid $27 million for the first and second floors of the building in 2018 with Hill purchasing the third and fourth floors in 2016. The value of the Hill collection is said to be valued at $800 million.

In 2018, the penthouse of the building was sold to Robert F. Smith for $59 million, making it the highest priced purchase on record in Manhattan.
