= 151 North Franklin =

Office skyscraper in Chicago, Illinois

CNA Center
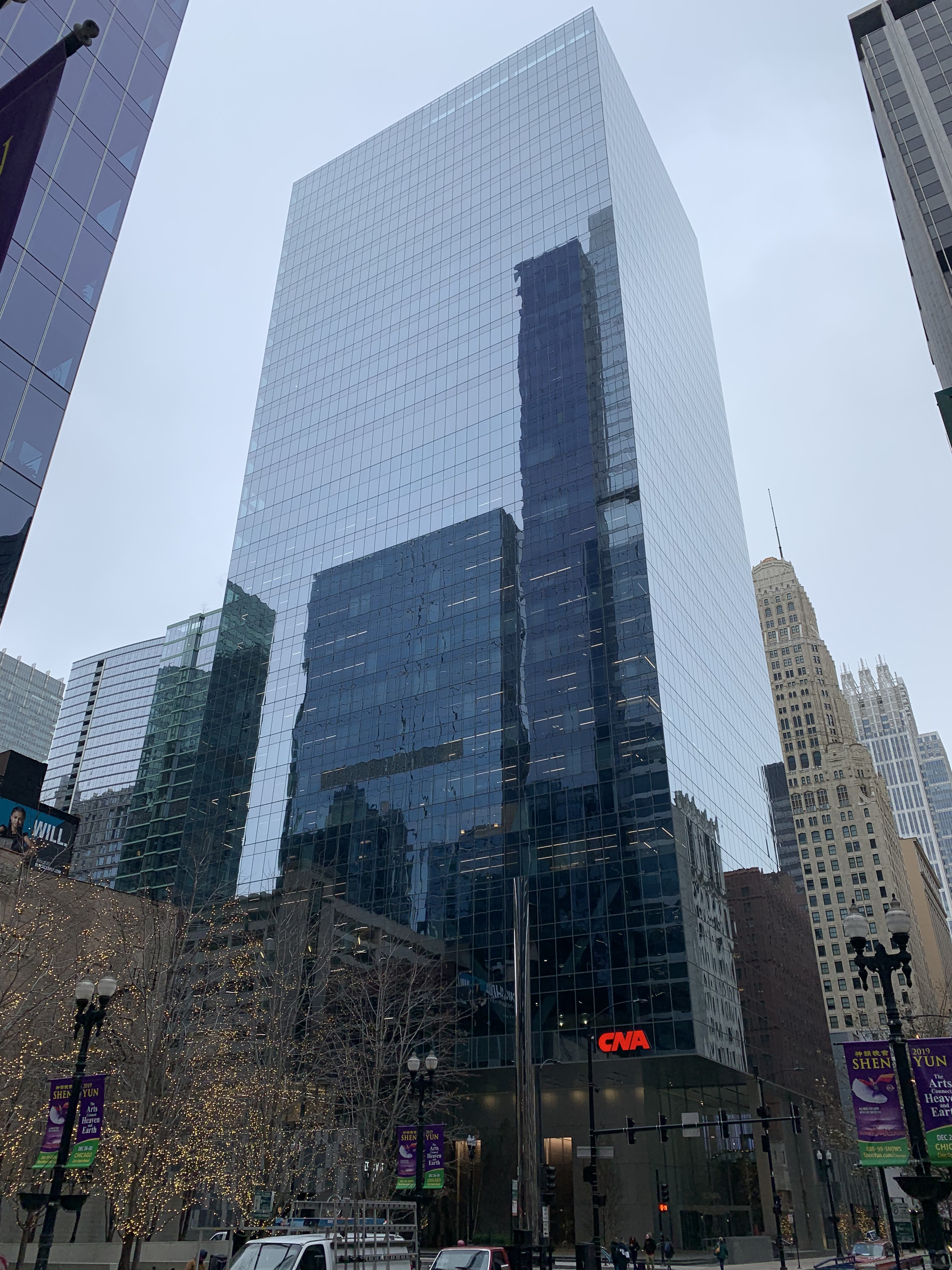
- View from Randolph Street in 2018

- Location within Chicago metropolitan area Location within Illinois
- Former names: 151 North Franklin

General information
- Status: Completed
- Type: commercial
- Location: Chicago, Illinois, US, 151 North Franklin Street
- Coordinates: 41.8848°N 87.6350°W
- Construction started: 2015
- Completed: 2018

Height
- Height: 568 feet (173 m)

Technical details
- Floor count: 35

Design and construction
- Architects: John Ronan Architects, AAI Associates, Inc. (as architect of record)

151 North Franklin (officially named CNA Center) is a skyscraper located at 151 North Franklin Street Floor 9 in the Chicago Loop. Completed in 2018 and standing at 568 feet (173 meters) tall with 35 floors at the northeast corner of West Randolph Street and North Franklin Street, the building is the current corporate headquarters of namesake tenant CNA Insurance, which has been headquartered in the Loop since 1900. It also hosts large office spaces for Facebook and the law firm Hinshaw & Culbertson.

== History ==
The vision for the building first became public in 2013 when renderings were availed for a 30-story building from developer John Buck designed by John Ronan, with AAI Associates, Inc. as architect of record. In November 2013, Buck announced $145 million of equity financing for a 36-story building with 825,000 square feet (76,645 m^{2}) of office space.

In February 2015, law firm Freeborn & Peters (Chicago's 22nd largest) signed a 15-year 5-floor letter of intent. That May, law firm Hinshaw & Culbertson (Chicago's 14th largest) signed a lease in the building. In August 2015, Freeborn & Peters accepted an offer to remain at 311 South Wacker Drive, but Buck went ahead with filing for demolition permits for the Walgreens at that location. In December 2015, CNA Insurance decided to relocate its headquarters from the 44-story CNA Center at 333 South Wabash that it had owned since its debut in 1972 to the new CNA Center building. The plan included selling the old building to Buck for $108 million, temporarily leasing space in that building until moving into the newly leased space with signage and naming rights. By that time the Walgreens on the site had been demolished and construction was expected to commence soon. Northern Trust would sign to consolidate many of its offices into the old CNA Center, which was to be renamed by Northern Trust.

In June 2018, 151 North Franklin became the new corporate headquarters for CNA Insurance, which has been headquartered in the Chicago Loop since 1900. Prior Loop headquarters included following locations: Metropolitan Tower (Continental Center I from 1943–1962 at 310 South Michigan Avenue), 55 East Jackson Boulevard (Continental Center II from 1962–1972) and CNA Center (Continental Center III from 1972–2018 at 333 South Wabash Avenue). Facebook signed a large lease in the building in July 2018.

== Features ==
The building has a column-free open-office design with many modern elements that pays homage to the 70-degree angle of the CNA logo. Chicago Tribune critic Blair Kamin praised the open air base but felt much of the rest of the glassy exterior was evidence of budgetary limitations.

== See also ==
- List of tallest buildings in Chicago
