= Transamerica Pyramid =

Skyscraper in San Francisco

Transamerica Pyramid Center

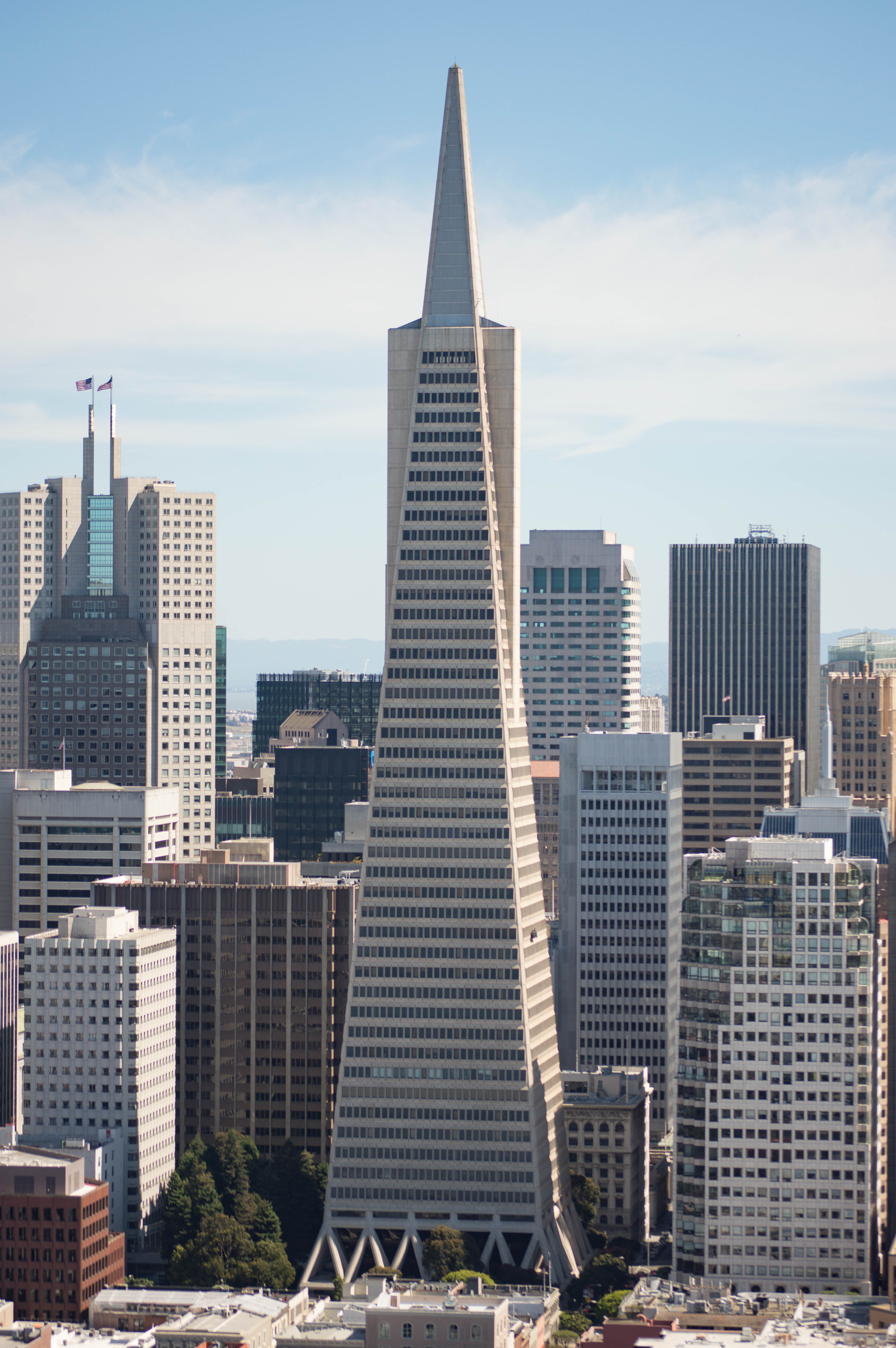
- Transamerica Pyramid in 2015

- Location within San Francisco Location within California Location within the United States

Record height
- Tallest in San Francisco from 1969 to 2017^{[I]}
- Preceded by: Bank of America Center
- Surpassed by: Salesforce Tower

General information
- Status: Completed
- Type: Commercial offices
- Location: 600 Montgomery Street; San Francisco, California
- Coordinates: 37.7952°N 122.4028°W
- Construction started: December 1969
- Completed: 1972; 54 years ago
- Cost: US$32 million
- Owner: Yoda PLC
- Operator: Jones Lang LaSalle Americas, Inc.

Height
- Roof: 853 ft (260 m)
- Top floor: 695 ft (212 m)

Technical details
- Floor count: 48
- Floor area: 499,000 sq ft (46,400 m^{2})
- Lifts/elevators: 18

Design and construction
- Architects: William L. Pereira & Harry D. Som
- Structural engineer: Chin & Hensolt, Inc. Glumac International; Simonson & Simonson
- Main contractor: Dinwiddie Construction Co.

Website
- transamericapyramid.com

The Transamerica Pyramid Center (locally known in some communities as “Big Pointy") is a pyramid-shaped 48-story modernist skyscraper in San Francisco, California, United States, and the second tallest building in the San Francisco skyline. Located at 600 Montgomery Street between Clay and Washington Streets in the city's Financial District, it was the tallest building in San Francisco from its completion in 1972 until 2017 and the tallest building in America west of Chicago until 1973. The building no longer houses the headquarters of the Transamerica Corporation, which moved its U.S. headquarters to Baltimore, Maryland. The building is still associated with the company by being depicted on the company's logo. Designed by architects William Pereira and Harry D. Som, and built by Hathaway Dinwiddie Construction Company, the building stands at 853 feet (260 m). On completion in 1972 it was the eighth-tallest building in the world. It is also a popular tourist site. In 2020, the building was sold to NYC investor Michael Shvo, who in 2022 hired Norman Foster to redesign the interiors and renovate the building. As of April 2026, the Transamerica Pyramid Center was acquired by Yoda PLC, a Cyprus-based investment firm led by Greek investor Ioannis Papalekas.

== History ==
The area in which the building stands is historically important in the history of San Francisco. It is built on reclaimed land and stands on what was once the shoreline of Yerba Buena Cove, around which the Mexican pueblo of Yerba Buena was founded in 1834. During the Mexican-American War, a detachment from the USS Portsmouth landed on this shoreline in 1846 and raised the American flag at what is now Portsmouth Square, establishing American ownership of the city. Land reclamation of Yerba Buena Cove proceeded rapidly in the expanding city, and the Montgomery Block building was built on the site in 1853. The building housed offices and apartments for some of the city's best-known financiers, lawyers, and artists for over 100 years, before being demolished in 1959 and replaced by a parking lot.

Transamerica Corporation was founded by A. P. Giannini in 1928, who bought the former Fugazi Bank Building at 4 Columbus Avenue, across from Montgomery Block, as a home for the newly-founded company. The flatiron-shaped building served as the headquarters for Transamerica Corporation until its 1972 move across the street into the Transamerica Pyramid. The former Transamerica Building now serves as San Francisco headquarters of the Church of Scientology.

The new Transamerica building was commissioned by Transamerica CEO John (Jack) R. Beckett, who chose an unusual pyramidal shape because he wished to allow light in the street below. Construction began on the site of the former Montgomery Block in 1969 and was completed in 1972, overseen by San Francisco–based contractor Dinwiddie Construction, now Hathaway Dinwiddie Construction Company. Upon completion, the building had a structural height of 853 feet (260 m) and 48 floors of retail and office space.

The Transamerica Pyramid was the tallest skyscraper west of Chicago upon completion in 1972, surpassing the then Bank of America Center, also in San Francisco. It was surpassed by the Aon Center, Los Angeles, in 1974. In 2017, the still under-construction Salesforce Tower surpassed the Transamerica Pyramid as the tallest building in San Francisco, and upon completion in 2018, surpassed the Transamerica Pyramid by 117 feet in roof height and by 217 in total height.

The building is evocative of San Francisco and has become one of the many symbols of the city. Designed by architect William Pereira, it faced opposition during planning and construction and was sometimes referred to by detractors as "Pereira's Prick". John King of the San Francisco Chronicle summed up the improved opinion of the building in 2009 as "an architectural icon of the best sort – one that fits its location and gets better with age." King also wrote in 2011 that it is "a uniquely memorable building, a triumph of the unexpected, unreal and engaging all at once. ... It is a presence and a persona, snapping into different focus with every fresh angle, every shift in light."

The building is thought to have been the intended target of a terrorist attack, involving the hijacking of airplanes as part of the Bojinka plot, which was foiled in 1995. It is one of 39 San Francisco high rises reported by the U.S. Geological Survey as potentially vulnerable to a large earthquake, due to a flawed welding technique.

In 1999, Transamerica was acquired by the Dutch insurance company Aegon. Transamerica and Aegon maintained only minimal presence in the building, with the majority of Transamerica's operations being shifted to Cedar Rapids, Iowa and other back office locations around the United States. In 2011, Transamerica moved out of the building and out of San Francisco entirely, relocating its headquarters to the Transamerica Tower in Baltimore. (The company would move out of that building in 2015 after further downsizing.) Although the building was no longer Transamerica Corporation headquarters, it is still associated with the company and is depicted in the company's logo, appearing even on the new company building in Baltimore.

In 2020, Aegon sold the building to SHVO and Deutsche Finance America for $650 million. In 2022, SHVO and partners hired architect Norman Foster to undertake a $250 million renovation.

== Design ==
The land use and zoning restrictions for the parcel limited the number of square feet of office that could be built upon the lot, which sits at the north boundary of the financial district.

The building is a tall, four-sided pyramid with two "wings" to accommodate an elevator shaft on the east and a stairwell and a smoke tower on the west. The top 212 feet (65 m) of the building is the spire. There are four cameras pointed in the four cardinal directions at the top of this spire forming the "Transamerica Virtual Observation Deck." Four monitors in the lobby, whose direction and zoom can be controlled by visitors, display the cameras' views 24 hours a day. An observation deck on the 27th floor was closed: the Pyramid's official website says that it was closed to the public in 2001, while The New York Times reported that it has been closed "[s]ince the late 1990s". It was replaced by the virtual observation deck a few years later. The video signal from the "Transamericam" was used for years by a local TV news station for live views of traffic and weather in downtown San Francisco.

The top of the Transamerica Pyramid is covered with aluminum panels. During the Christmas holiday season, on Independence Day, and during the anniversary of 9/11, a brightly twinkling beacon called the "Crown Jewel" is lit at the top of the pyramid.

== Gallery ==
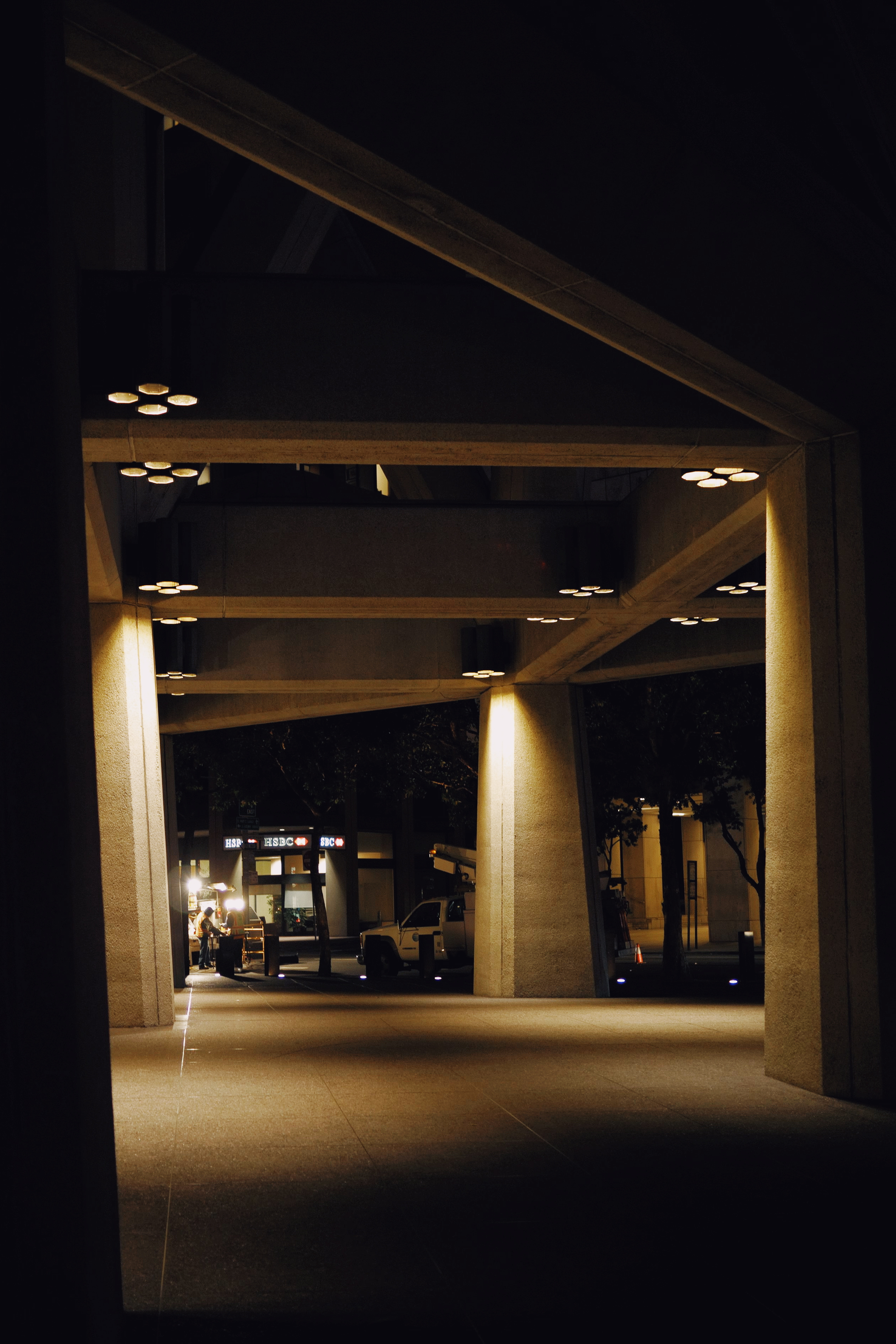
Base

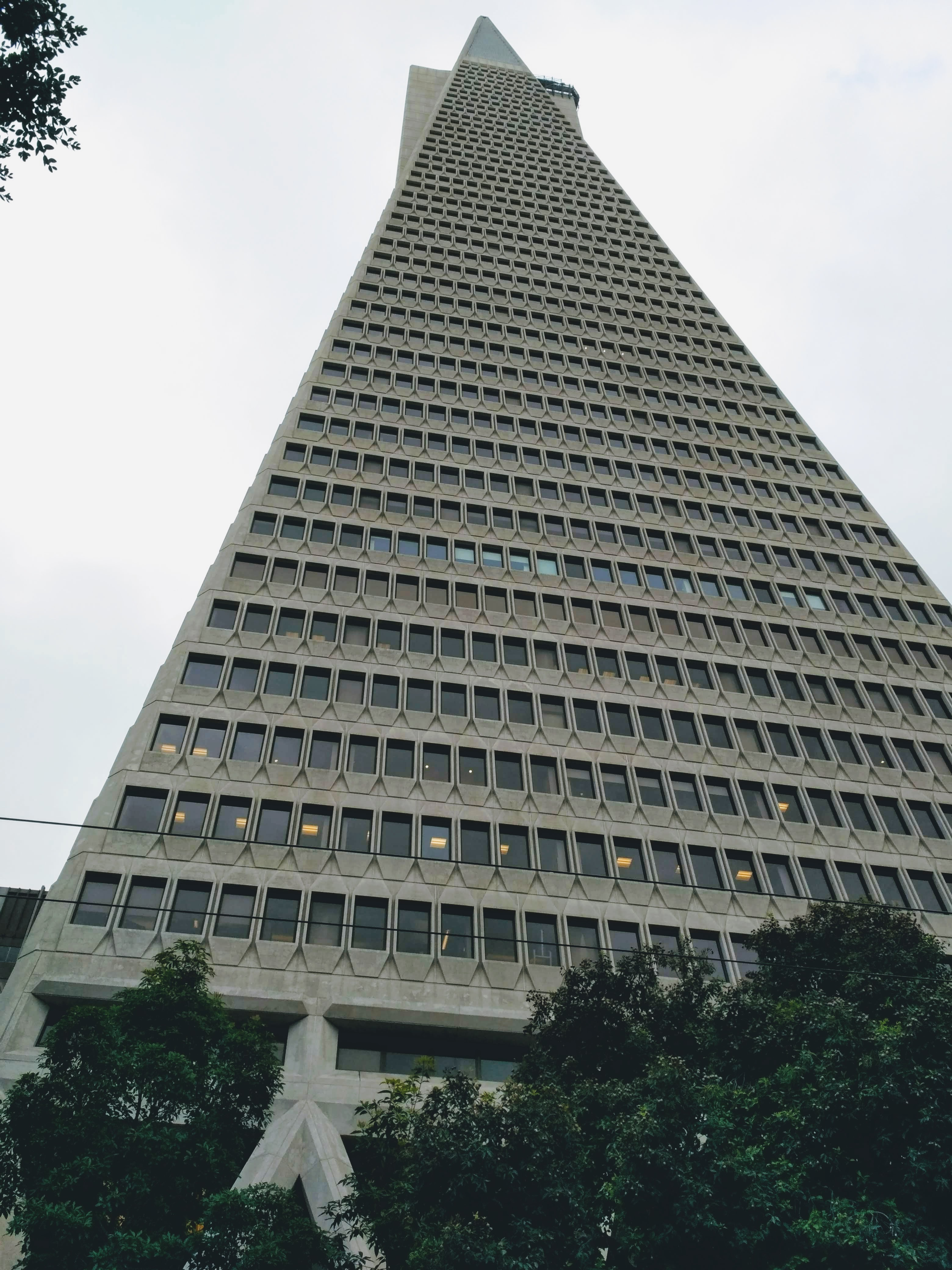
The Transamerica Pyramid

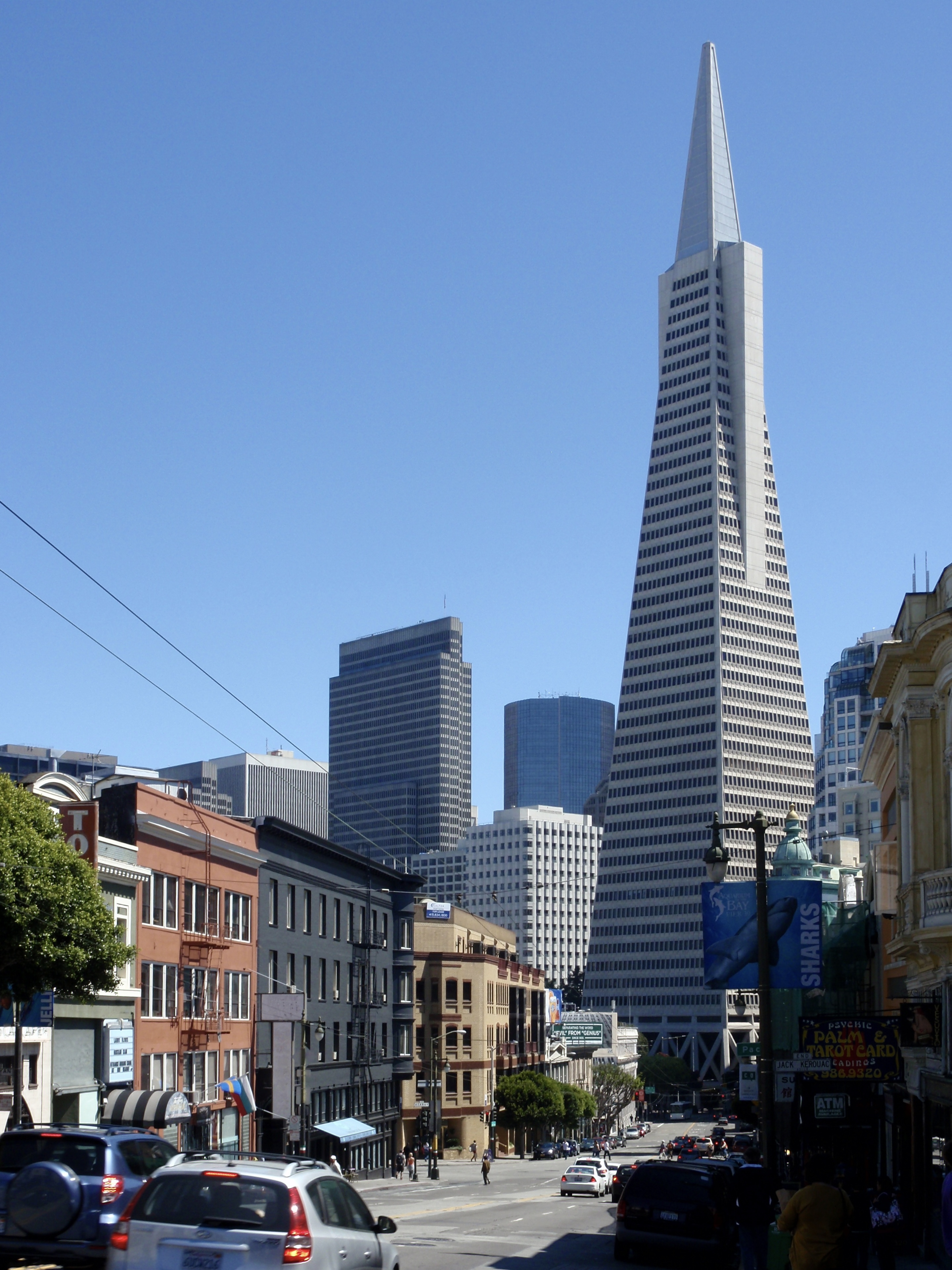
From Columbus Avenue (2012)

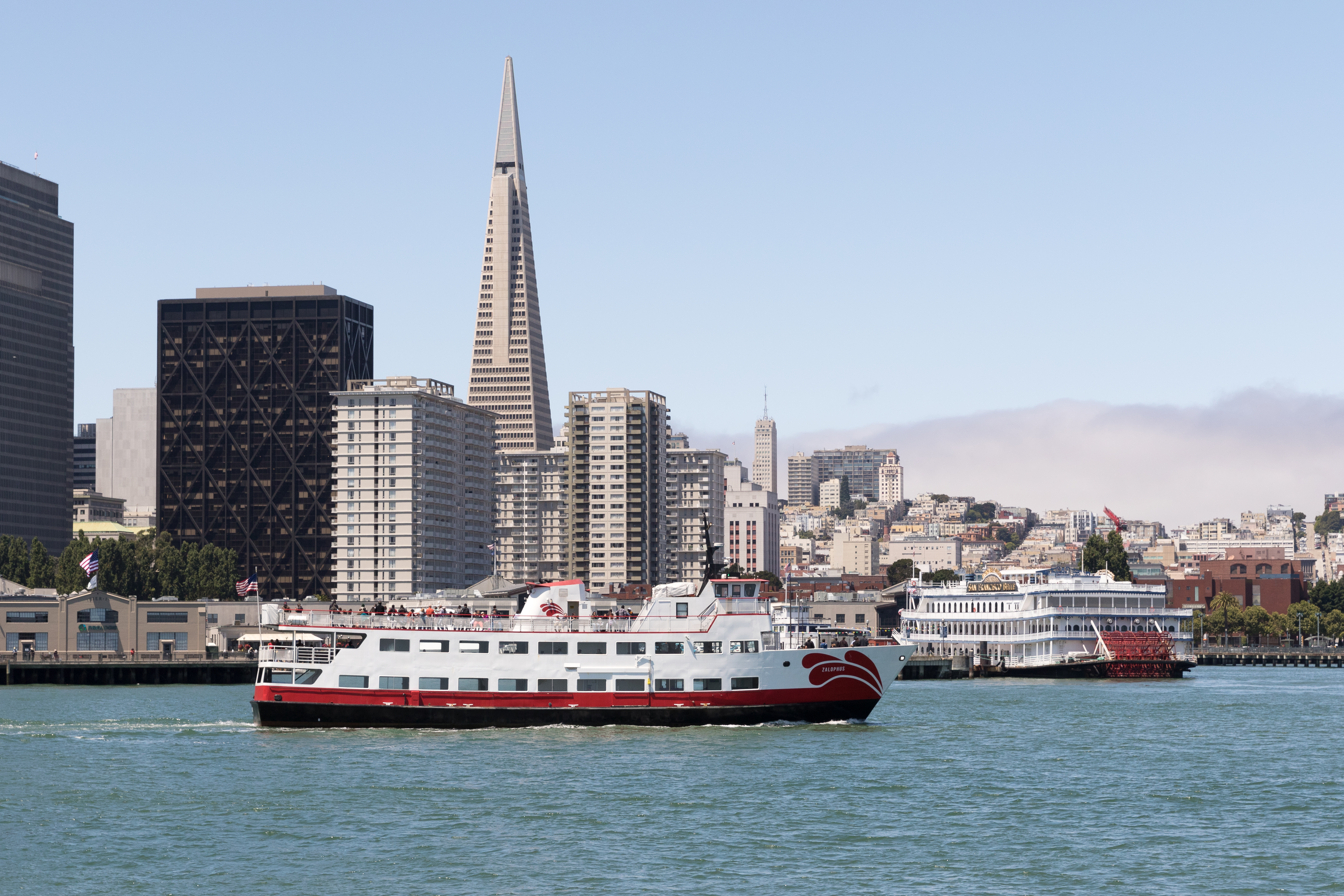
From San Francisco Bay (2017)

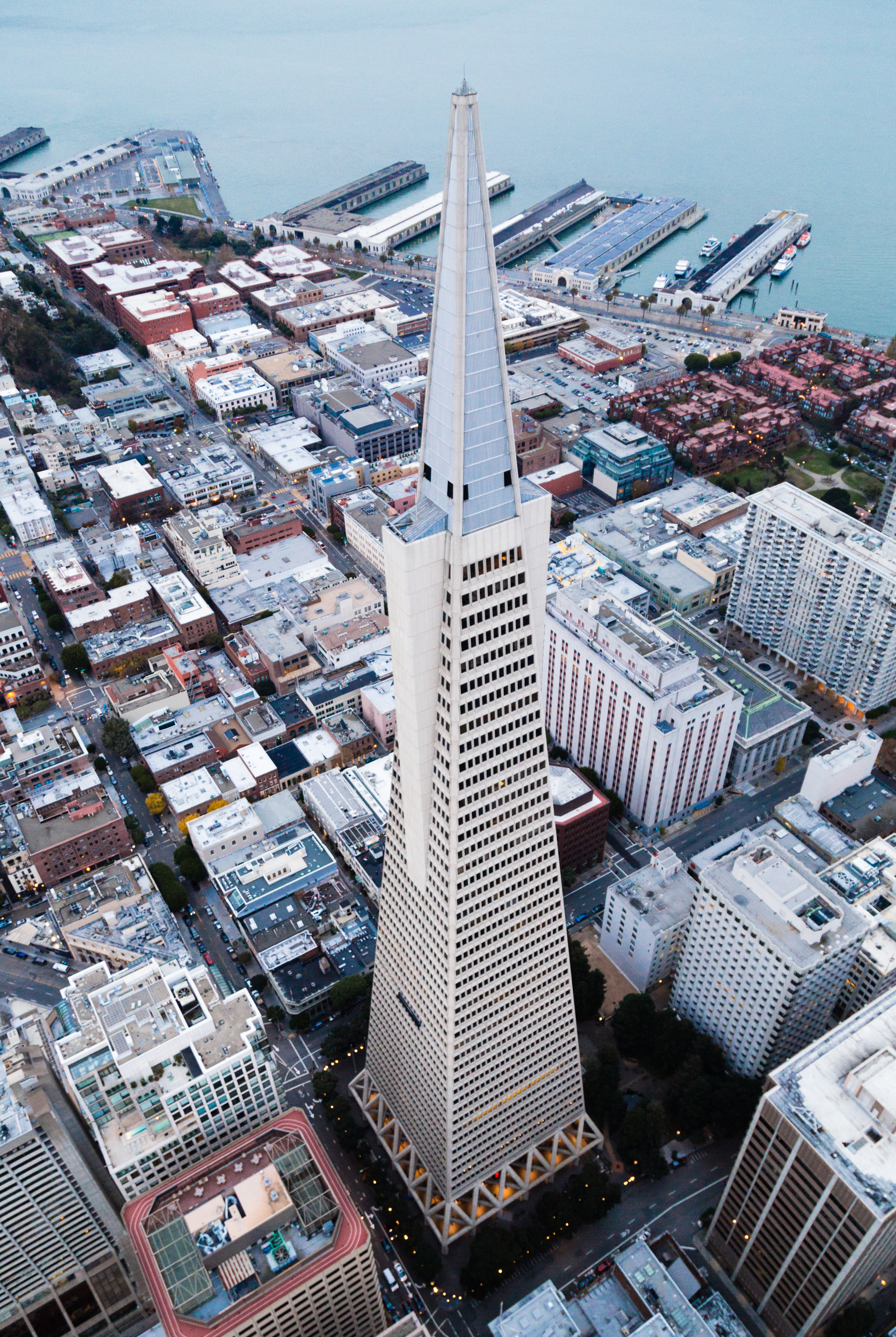
Steep aerial view, featuring spire (2016)

Aerial view at dusk

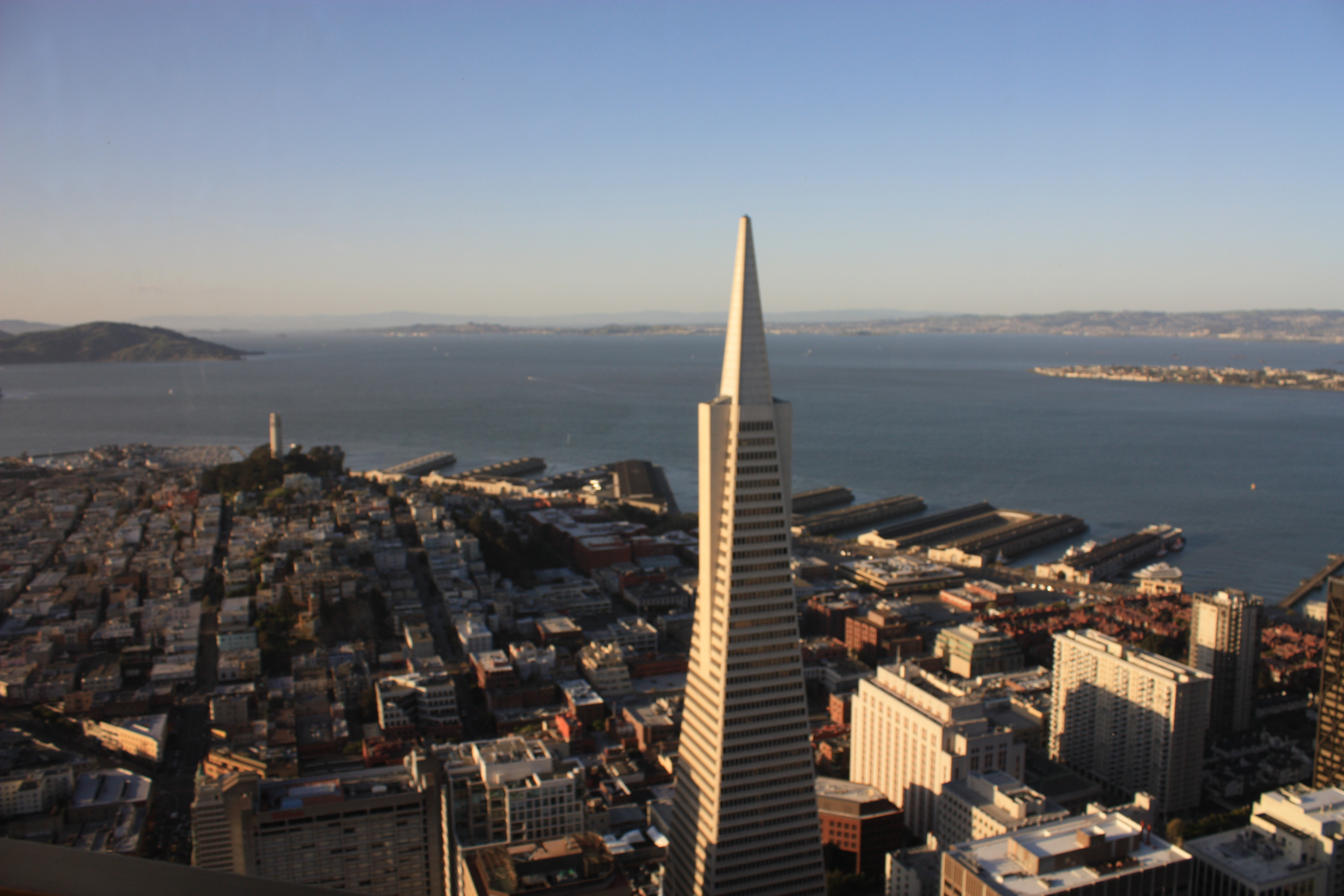
Viewed from 555 California (2009)

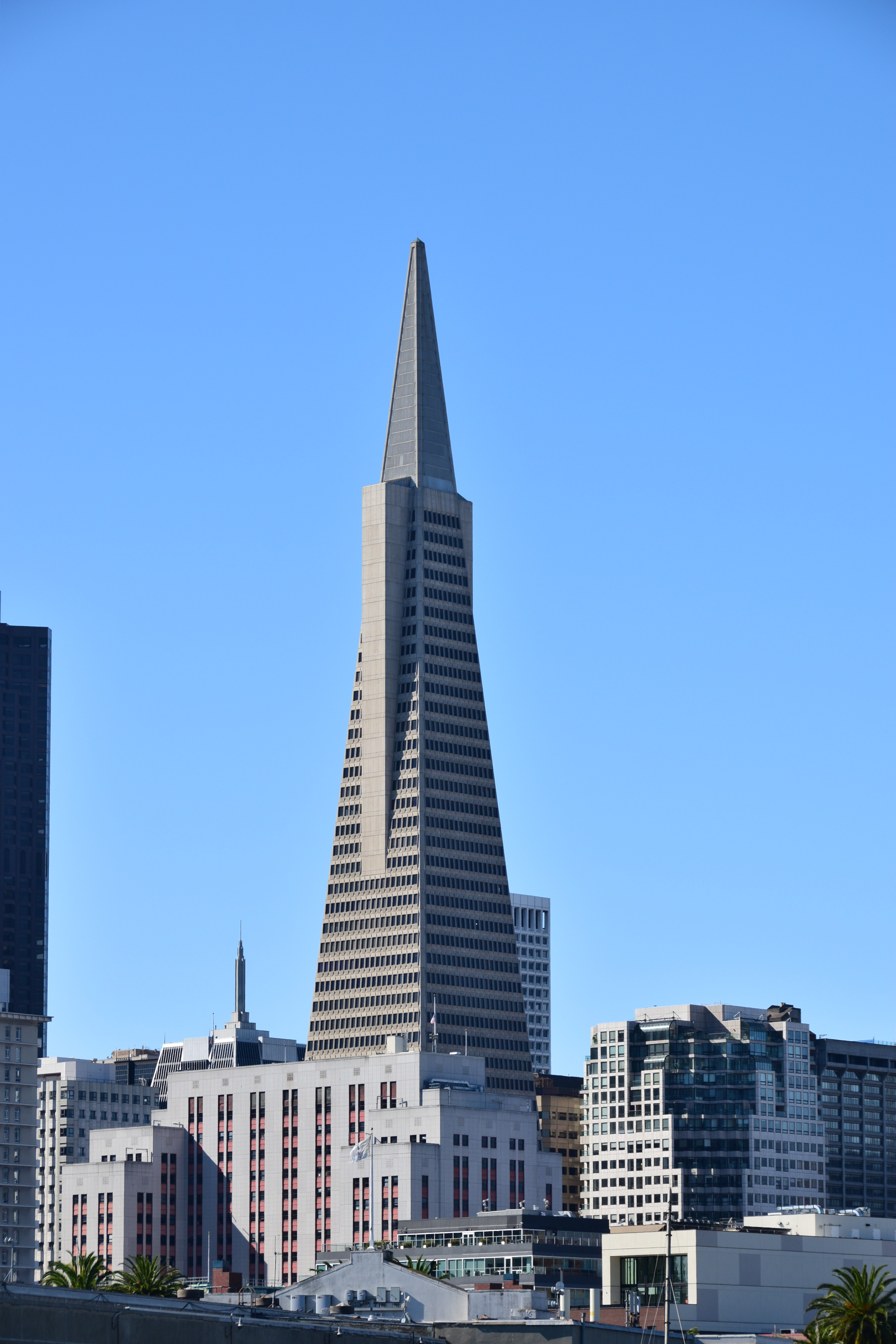
Viewed from the Embarcadero (2023)

== Park ==
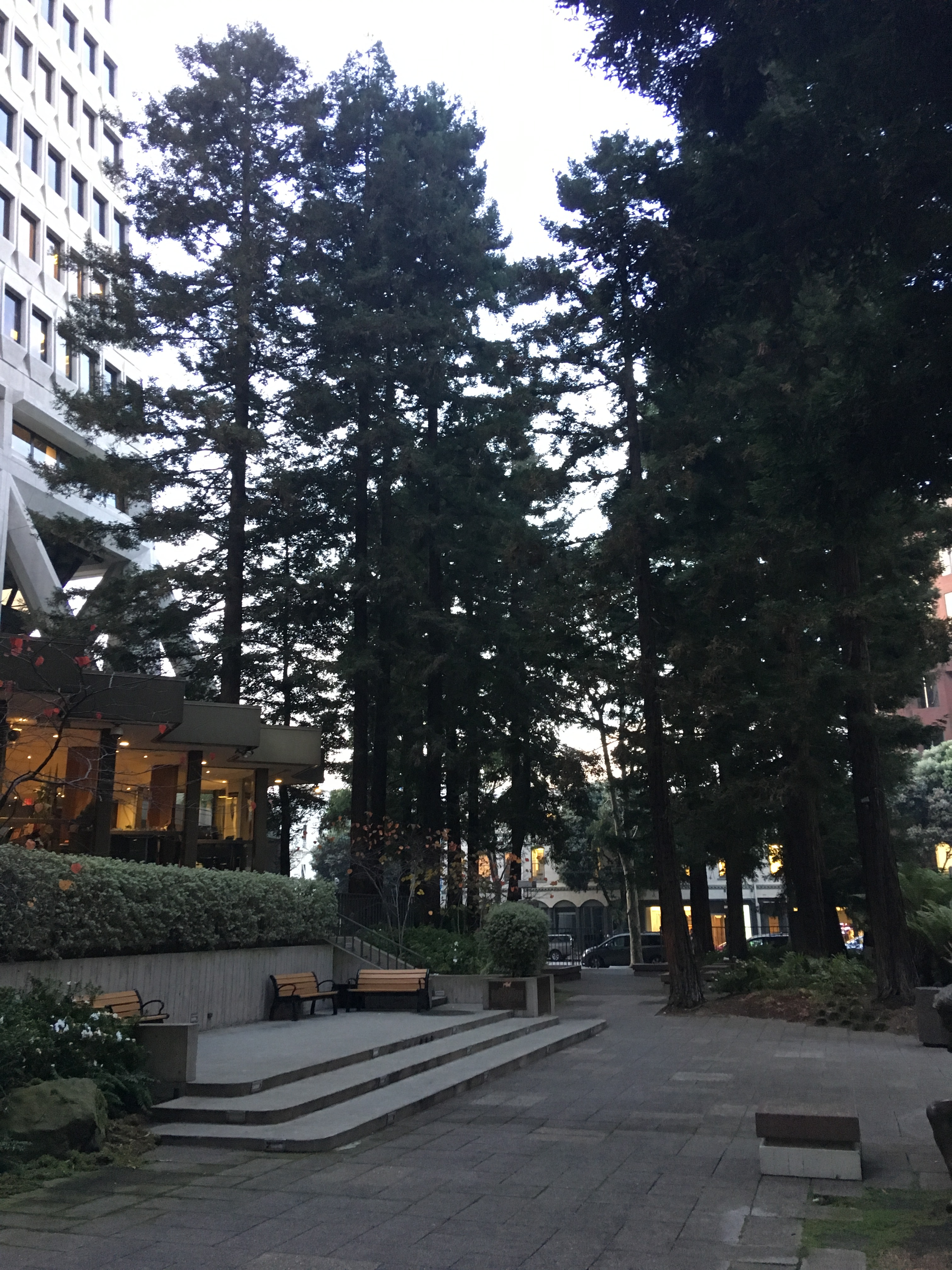
The Redwood Park on the grounds of the Transamerica Pyramid at dusk

At the base of the building is a half-acre privately owned public space designed by Tom Galli called Redwood Park. A number of redwood trees were transplanted to this park from the Santa Cruz Mountains when the tower was built. It features a fountain and pond designed by Anthony Guzzardo, containing a jumping frog and lily pads bronze sculpture commemorating "The Celebrated Jumping Frog of Calaveras County" by Mark Twain (sculpture by Richard Clopton, 1996); a Glenna Goodacre bronze sculpture of children at play (1989); a bronze plaque honoring the dogs Bummer and Lazarus, celebrating their skill at catching rats; and benches and tables offering respite to workers and visitors alike.

== Specifications ==
Comparison of approximate profiles of the Transamerica Pyramid with some notable pyramidal or near-pyramidal buildings. Dotted lines indicate original heights, where data is available. In its SVG file, hover over a pyramid to highlight and click for its article.

- The building's façade is covered in crushed quartz, giving the building its light color.
- The four-story base contains 16,000 cubic yards (12,000 m^{3}) of concrete and over 300 miles (480 km) of steel rebar.
- It has 3,678 windows.
- The building's foundation is 9 feet (2.7 m) thick, the result of a 3-day, 24-hour continuous concrete pour. Several thousand dollars in coins were thrown into the pit by observers surrounding the site at street level during the pouring, for good luck.
- Only two of the building's 18 elevators reach the top floor.
- The original proposal was for a 1,150-foot (350 m) building, which for a year would have been the second-tallest completed building in the world. The proposal was rejected by the city planning commission, saying it would interfere with views of San Francisco Bay from Nob Hill.
- The building is on the site that was the temporary home of A. P. Giannini's Bank of Italy after the 1906 San Francisco earthquake destroyed its office. Giannini founded Transamerica in 1928 as a holding company for his financial empire. Bank of Italy later became Bank of America.
- There is a plaque commemorating two famous dogs, Bummer and Lazarus, at the base of the building.
- The hull of the whaling vessel Niantic, an artifact of the 1849 California Gold Rush, lay almost beneath the Transamerica Pyramid, and the location is marked by a historical plaque outside the building (California Historical Landmark #88).
- The aluminum cap is indirectly illuminated from within to balance the appearance at night.
- The two wings increase interior space at the upper levels. One extension is the top of elevator shafts while the other is a smoke evacuation tower for fire-fighting.
- A glass pyramid cap sits at the top and encloses a red aircraft warning light and the brighter seasonal beacon.
- Because of the shape of the building, the majority of the windows can pivot 360 degrees so they can be washed from the inside.
- The spire is hollow and lined with a 100-foot steel stairway at a 60-degree angle, followed by two steel ladders.
- The conference room (with 360 degree views of the city) is located on the 48th floor.
- Construction began in 1969 and the first tenants moved in during the summer of 1972.

== Tenants ==
- ATEL Capital Group
- Bank of America Merrill Lynch
- Pantera Capital
- Crux Informatics
- Greenhill & Co.
- Heller Manus Architects
- Incapture Group
- Mars Inc.
- On Lok
- Pantheon Ventures
- Rembrandt Venture Partners
- TSG Consumer Partners
- Union Square Advisors LLC
- URS Corporation
- Paradigm

== Similar structures ==
- Burj Khalifa, a building in Dubai
- Ryugyong Hotel, a building in Pyongyang
- The Shard, a building in London

== See also ==
- 49-Mile Scenic Drive
- List of tallest buildings
- List of tallest buildings in San Francisco
- List of tallest pyramids
