= J. Tomilson Hill =

American hedge fund manager

- Born: James Tomilson Hill III; May 24, 1948 (age 78)
- Education: The Buckley School; Milton Academy
- Alma mater: Harvard College; Harvard Business School
- Occupation: hedge fund manager
- Spouse: Janine W. Hill
- Children: 2

James Tomilson "Tom" Hill III (born May 24, 1948) is an American billionaire hedge fund manager, the former president and CEO of Blackstone Alternative Asset Management (BAAM), Blackstone Group's hedge funds business.

== Early life and education ==
Hill was born in New York and attended The Buckley School and Milton Academy, where he was a varsity wrestler. Hill received his B.A., cum laude, from Harvard College, where he wrote for The Harvard Lampoon and studied history, literature, and Japanese studies. He received his M.B.A. from Harvard Business School.

== Career ==
Hill started his career at First Boston in 1973, where he was one of the founding principals of its mergers and acquisitions department, and then moved to Smith Barney, where he served as the head of its mergers and acquisitions department. In 1982, he joined Lehman Brothers as a partner in its M&A department and later became head of M&A, head of Investment Banking and co-CEO. Filmmaker Oliver Stone used J. Tomilson Hill as one of several inspirations for the character Gordon Gekko, portrayed by Michael Douglas in the 1987 movie, Wall Street.

While at Lehman, Hill participated in the multi-sided takeover battle for control of RJR Nabisco in 1988, the largest leveraged buyout in history up to that time, and a seminal event in the history of private equity. Barbarians at the Gate, the best-selling book chronicling that saga, described Hill as “an oiled-back Gordon Gekko haircut atop 5 feet, 10 inches of icy Protestant reserve.”

In 1993 Hill joined Blackstone, where he served as co-head of the corporate mergers and acquisitions advisory group. In 2007, he became vice chairman of the firm. Since 2000, he has served as president and chief executive of Blackstone's hedge fund business, Blackstone Alternative Asset Management (BAAM), and has grown that business's assets under management from $1.3 billion in 2000 to $56 billion as of December 31, 2013.

BAAM is currently the world's largest discretionary allocator to hedge funds, with investors including mostly corporate and public pension funds, sovereign wealth funds and central banks. The business's growth from 2007 to 2013, at a time when the industry generally contracted substantially, was featured in a June 2013 Harvard Business Review case study. Hill has appeared at the 2014 Credit Suisse Financial Services Forum, the 2011 Milken Institute Global Conference, and the 2012 Bloomberg Hedge Fund Summit, among others. In 2014, Hill was inducted into Institutional Investor's Alpha's "Hedge Fund Hall of Fame".

In the spring of 2021, it was announced that Hill would become chairman of private investments at Two Sigma, a 'quant' hedge fund with $58 billion in assets under management.

== Philanthropy ==
Hill is the chairman of Lincoln Center Theater and has served as chairman of the Smithsonian's Hirshhorn Museum and Sculpture Garden. He was elected to the Board of Trustees of the Metropolitan Museum of Art in 2012. He has also served on boards at the Council on Foreign Relations, the Telluride Foundation, Nasher Museum of Art, the Advantage Testing Foundation, and Our Lady Queen of Angels School, a Catholic school in East Harlem that is part of the Partnership for Inner-City Education school network.

In 2014, the Frick Collection presented "Renaissance and Baroque Bronzes from the Hill Collection", a group of thirty-three statuettes from Hill's personal collection that date from the mid-fifteenth to the eighteenth centuries. In 2017, Hill opened the Hill Art Foundation a gallery on West 24th Street in Chelsea to exhibit his private collection to the public in 2019.

== Personal life ==
Hill lives in Manhattan with his wife, Saint Louis native Janine W. Hill, who serves as director of fellowship affairs and studies strategic planning at the Council on Foreign Relations. They have two daughters: Margot Langdon Hill Kirby and Astrid Hill Lloyd.

In 2004, Hill sold Mark Rothko's No. 6 (Yellow, White, Blue Over Yellow on Gray) (1954) for $17.3 million at Sotheby's, a record for the artist.
