= Raleigh Hotel (Miami Beach) =

Hotel in Miami Beach, Florida, USA

Coordinates: 25.79372°N 80.12902°W

General information
- Location: Miami Beach, Florida, United States
- Opened: 1940

Design and construction
- Other designers: Lawrence Murray Dixon

The Raleigh Hotel in the South Beach section of Miami Beach, Florida is an art deco building designed by L. Murray Dixon. It is located at 1775 Collins Avenue. The hotel was closed in 2017 after damage from Hurricane Irma. In 2019 it was purchased by a group of developers including SHVO and Deutsche Finance America. In March 2022, it was announced that the hotel would be restored and operated by Rosewood Hotels, reopening in 2027 as Rosewood The Raleigh Miami Beach. In 2025, SHVO was forced to sell The Raleigh as an onslaught of legal and financial issues, including RICO allegations, unravelled his business. Nahla Capital, a NYC-based private equity real estate company acquired the property having delivered a successful Rosewood Residence project in Beverly Hills.

== History ==
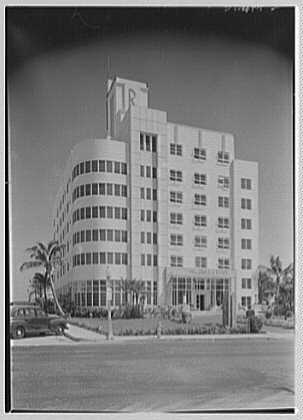
Raleigh Hotel, 1941

Raleigh Hotel was designed by Lawrence Murray Dixon and opened in 1940. Original construction cost for the property was $225,000. The first ownership change for the hotel came in 1941 when Max Marmerstein purchased a half interest in the amount of $90,000. In 1946, the hotel was purchased for $1 million by a group of investors from Boston, Massachusetts.

In 1979, the hotel became listed on the National Register of Historic Places as a contributing building in the Miami Beach Architectural District.

The hotel was purchased by the Brilla Group in 2009 for $30 million. It was sold again in 2012 to David Edelstein and Sam Nazarian for $55 million. It was the purchased by Hilfiger Hospitality in $56.5 million in 2014. In 2015, Hilfiger was approved by the Miami Beach Historic Preservation Board to renovate the hotel. The hotel was closed in 2017 after damage from Hurricane Irma prior to completion of the proposed renovations.

The hotel was again sold in 2019 for $103 million. This time, it was purchased by a partnership of developers which included SHVO and Deutsche Finance America. In March 2022, it was announced that the hotel would be restored and operated by Rosewood Hotels, reopening in 2027 as Rosewood The Raleigh Miami Beach.

== Design ==
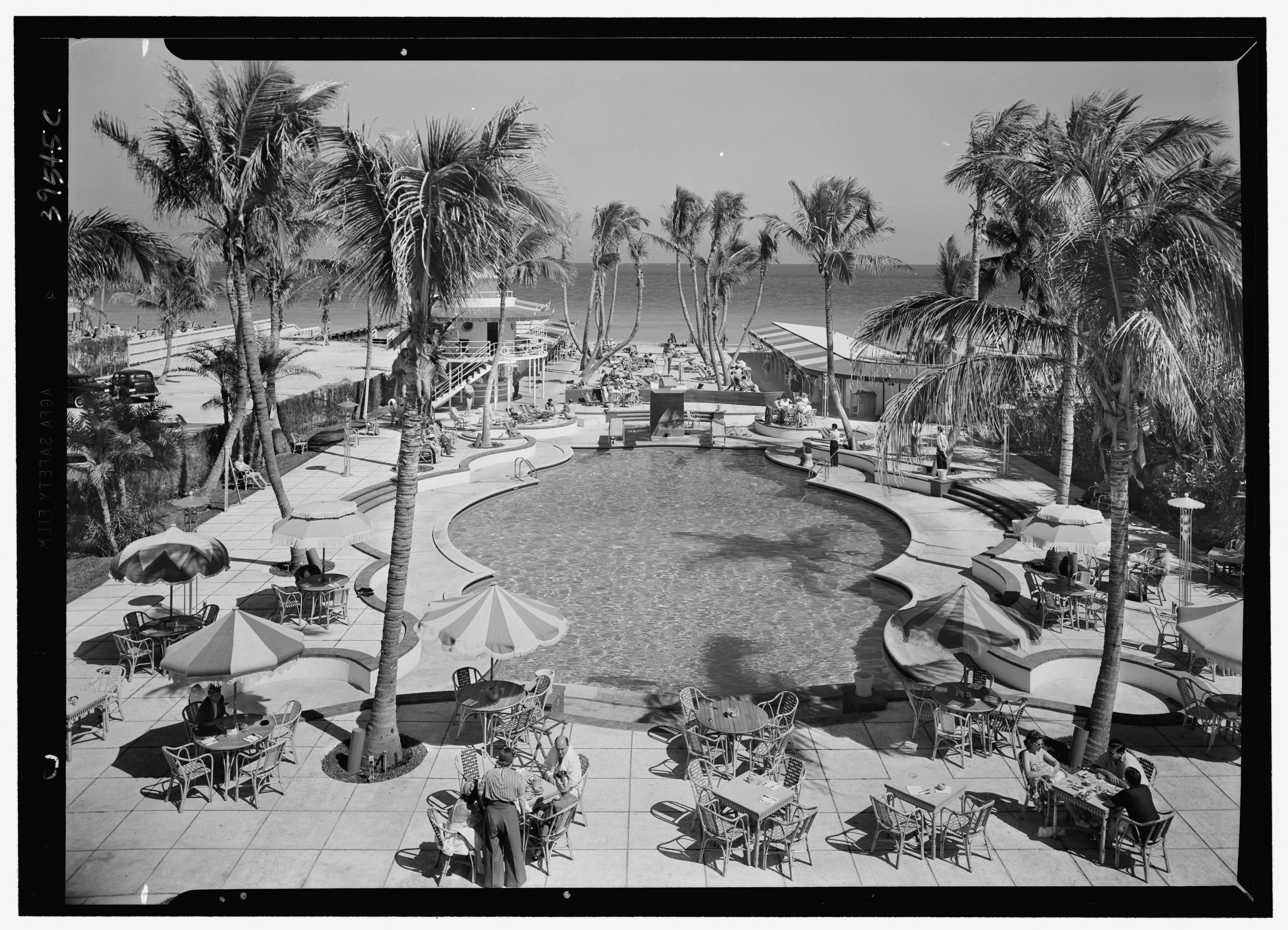
Raleigh Hotel pool, 1941

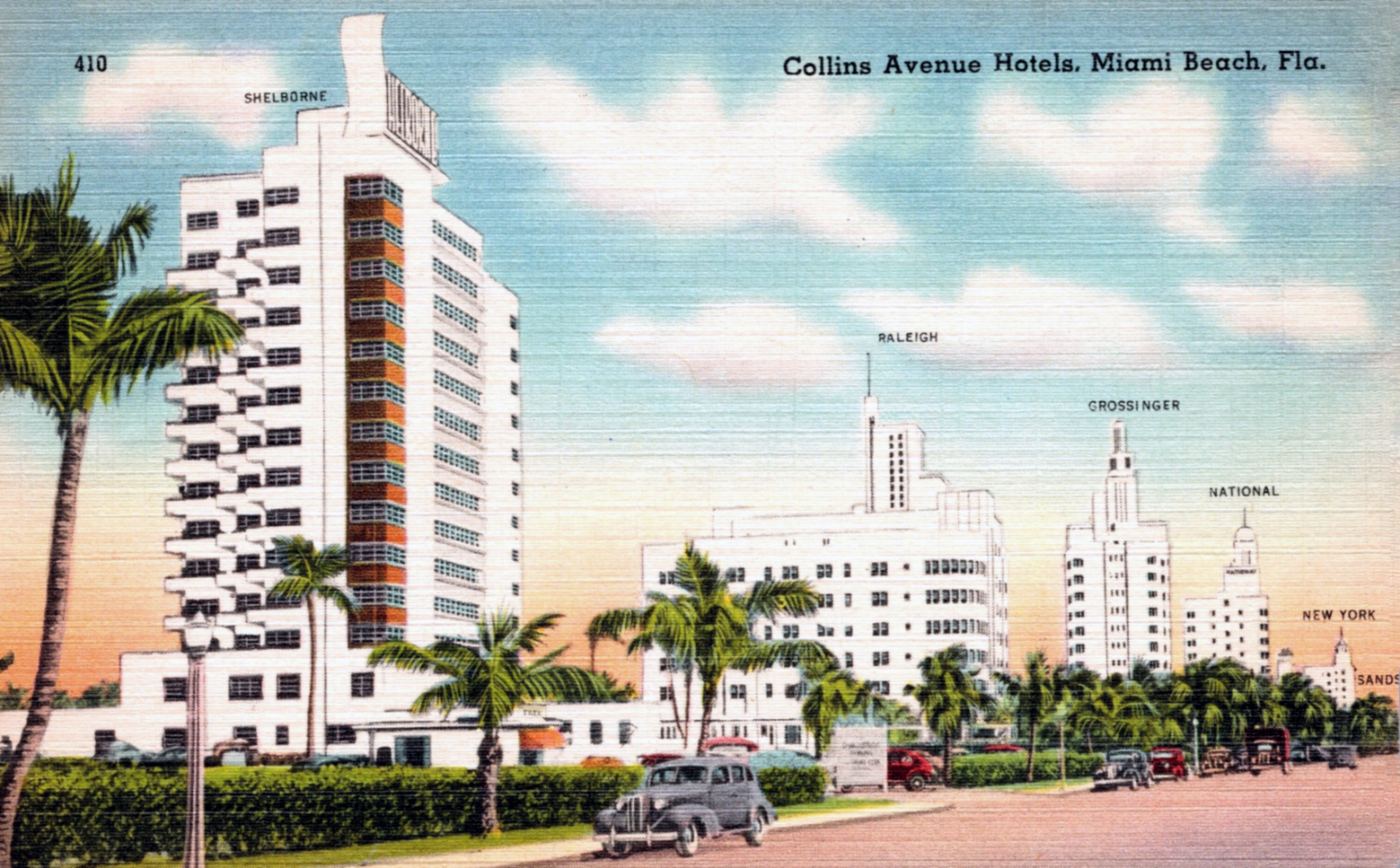
Raleigh Hotel in the middle, 1942

The original design of the hotel included 113 rooms. The entrances were decorated with polished stone and the lobby illuminated with recessed neon. The hotel included a lounge, known as the Raleigh room, as well as a dining room, cocktail lounge, barbershop, beauty parlor, and eight penthouses.

The Raleigh Hotel has an "iconic pool" which was used in several movies. It was featured on the cover of Life in the 1940s and featured in films that include The Birdcage, Bad Boys, and Up Close and Personal.
