= Michael Shvo =

Israeli-American real estate developer (born 1972)

- מייקל שבוא
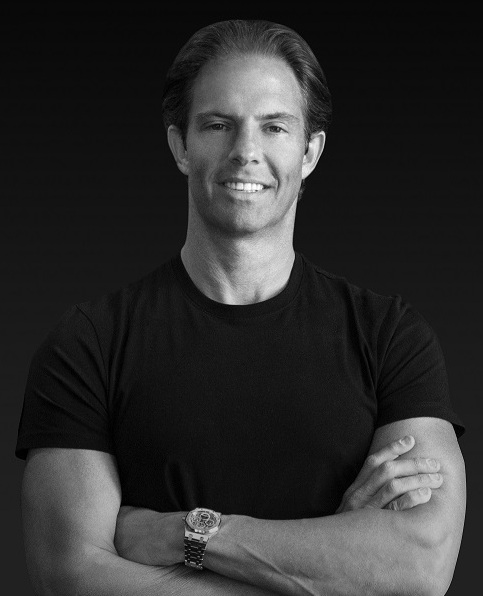
- Shvo in 2019
- Born: December 29, 1972 (age 53); Arsuf, Hof HaSharon, Israel
- Citizenship: United States; Israel
- Education: Bar-Ilan University (dropped out)
- Occupation: Real Estate Developer
- Known for: Founder of SHVO, real estate development company
- Spouse: Seren Shvo
- Children: 2 (Emma Shvo, and Judah Youval Shvo)
- Website: www.shvo.com

Michael Shvo (Hebrew: מייקל שבוא; born December 29, 1972) is an American real estate developer. He is the chairman and CEO of SHVO, a real estate development company he founded in 2004.

== Early life ==
Shvo was raised in Arsuf, Israel, by parents who were both chemistry professors. He completed his military service in Israel and studied finance at Bar-Ilan University but received no degree. In 1996, he emigrated to the United States with only $3,000.

== Career ==
Shvo initially managed a fleet of taxis prior to landing a job as a real-estate broker with Douglas Elliman, the largest brokerage in New York. In 2003, at the age of 30, he achieved more than $300 million in sales from more than 400 deals, becoming the firm's top broker. He created his own group within the firm and managed a staff of 27 people.

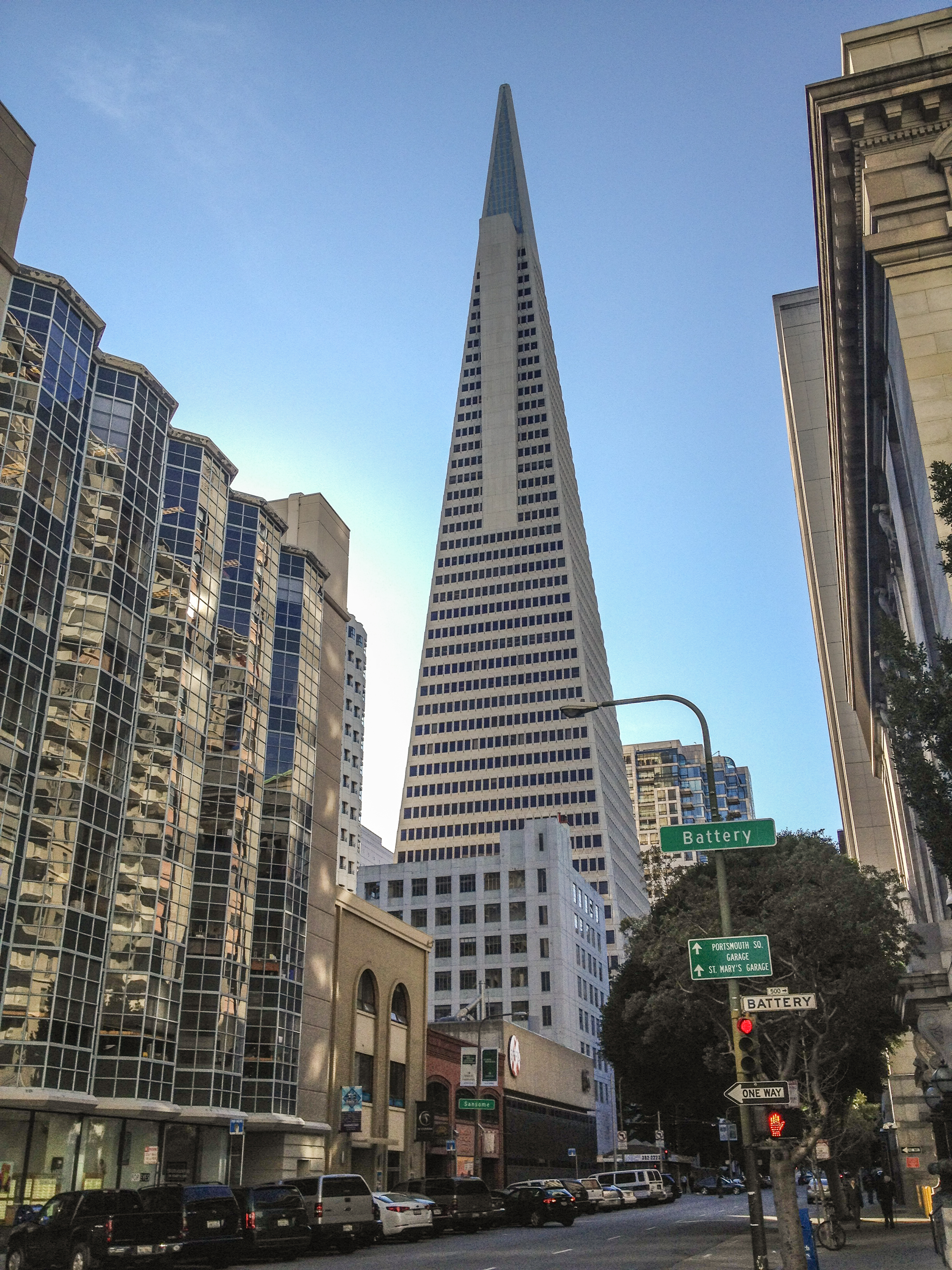
The Transamerica Pyramid, purchased by SHVO and partners in 2020.

Shvo left the firm in 2004 to launch his own international real estate firm, SHVO. His firm develops high end properties internationally. From 2003 through 2008, he performed $15 billion in real estate transactions worldwide, including Nurai, a private island off the coast of Abu Dhabi. Additional developments in New York included the Bryant Park Tower, The Lumiere on 53rd Street in Manhattan, Gramercy Starck designed by Philippe Starck, Jade by Jade Jagger, Fultonhaus, as well as Amangiri in Utah and Nizuc in Mexico. He was known for creating the marriage of fashion and real estate with his project 20 Pine Armani Casa, where Armani was hired to design the interior of the building.

Shvo took a break from real estate in 2008, focusing on his interest in the art world. He got back into the real estate market in 2013, initially purchasing a Getty Oil gas station at the corner of 10th Avenue and 24th Street in West Chelsea, Manhattan. He paid $23.5 million for the property which was a record price for per buildable square foot in Manhattan.

Prior to the development of the Getty property, Shvo turned the former gas station into a public art space. The inaugural show "Sheep Station" featured a white picket fence, grass and trees around the gas pumps, and 25 grazing concrete sheep sculptures by late artist François-Xavier Lalanne. The site has been developed into a high-end luxury condominium named The Getty Building, with Peter Marino designated as the architect for both the interior and exterior of the project.

In 2018, Shvo purchased the office portion of 685 Fifth Avenue, previously the headquarters of Gucci, from General Growth Partners (GGP), in partnership with Deutsche Finance Group, for 135 million dollars. It has since been disclosed that Shvo will be converting the building into ultra-luxury residences branded as the Mandarin Oriental Residences.

In 2019, Shvo made a number of purchases across asset classes. He purchased the Raleigh Hotel and the adjacent Richmond and South Seas Hotels from Tommy Hilfiger along with partners Deutsche Finance America. The same year, Shvo purchased a long-vacant piece of land on Wilshire Boulevard for $130 million, which the company announced is going to be developed into the Mandarin Oriental Residences Beverly Hills, as well as 711 Fifth Avenue, previously the headquarters of The Coca Cola Company, for $937 million. In 2020, Shvo acquired the Transamerica Pyramid in San Francisco for $650 million, and began work on a $250 million renovation in 2022. Also in 2020, he acquired 333 South Wabash in Chicago, known as Big Red, for $376 million, and 530 Broadway in New York’s Soho district for $382 million.

Shvo is one of several developers collectively pumping more than $2.5 billion into a handful of blocks along Collins Avenue, Miami. He has coined the project 'Billionaires Beach'.

In 2025, both of Michael Shvo's Miami projects were turned back to lenders or new developers, effectively removing SHVO as both developer and owner. The Raleigh project, long-stalled for multiple years, with low sales volume, was sold to NAHLA Capital for $270 million in October 2025. Shvo's Alton road project also failed to be constructed after surrendering the property in a deed in lieu of foreclosure.

In March 2026, the Transamerica Pyramid and two adjacent buildings were sold to Cyprus-based investment firm Yoda Plc for $691.6 million, ending Shvo's involvement with the property.

=== SHVO ===
SHVO is a real estate development company founded by Michael Shvo in 2004. It purchases and develops high end properties in the United States and internationally. Notable properties purchased and developed by SHVO have included Transamerica Pyramid in San Francisco, Raleigh Hotel in Miami, Big Red in Chicago, and 711 Fifth Avenue in New York. As of 2021, the company has assets of approximately $8 billion.

== Art projects ==
Shvo has conceived several art projects, including Documents of Desire & Disaster, a retrospective of contemporary photographer David La Chapelle’s work. He partnered with Paul Kasmin Gallery & Serdar Bilgili, who owns the Akaretler area in Istanbul where the exhibition took place in December 2010.

Shvo also created Getty Station, a public art installation at the former getty station on 10th avenue and 24th street in Manhattan. He purchased the property in early August 2013 and transformed into a sheep’s meadow with 25 sheep sculptures by Francois Xavier Lalanne. Shvo collaborated with Paul Kasmin Gallery for the exhibit.

Shvo also curated the selling exhibition Les Lalanne: The Poetry of Sculpture along with Paul Kasmin at the S|2 Gallery of Sotheby's Auction House in New York. It included rare Lalanne sculptures in a midnight garden setting.

In 2019 Shvo created an exhibition at the Raleigh Hotel, a property he had purchased the same year. Called "Les Lalanne at The Raleigh Gardens," it is a sculpture garden in memory of the French artist François-Xavier Lalanne.

== Recognition ==
Shvo was listed as one of "New York's City Shapers" by The New York Observer in 2007 and made the magazine's list of 100 Most Powerful People in New York Real Estate in 2008. He was also listed in Art+Auctions 2013 Power 100 List.

== Personal life ==
Shvo resides in New York City and The Hamptons with his wife, Seren Shvo. The couple has two children, Emma and Judah.

In 2016, Shvo was indicted on charges that included felony tax fraud and falsifying business records. He pleaded guilty to the charges in 2018, and paid $3.5 million in taxes and penalties. SHVO was subsequently removed from major development projects in New York City, including Aman New York at 730 Fifth Avenue and 125 Greenwich.
