= Metropolitan Tower (Chicago) =

Condominium building in Chicago, Illinois

Coordinates: 41°52′41.01″N 87°37′28.65″W

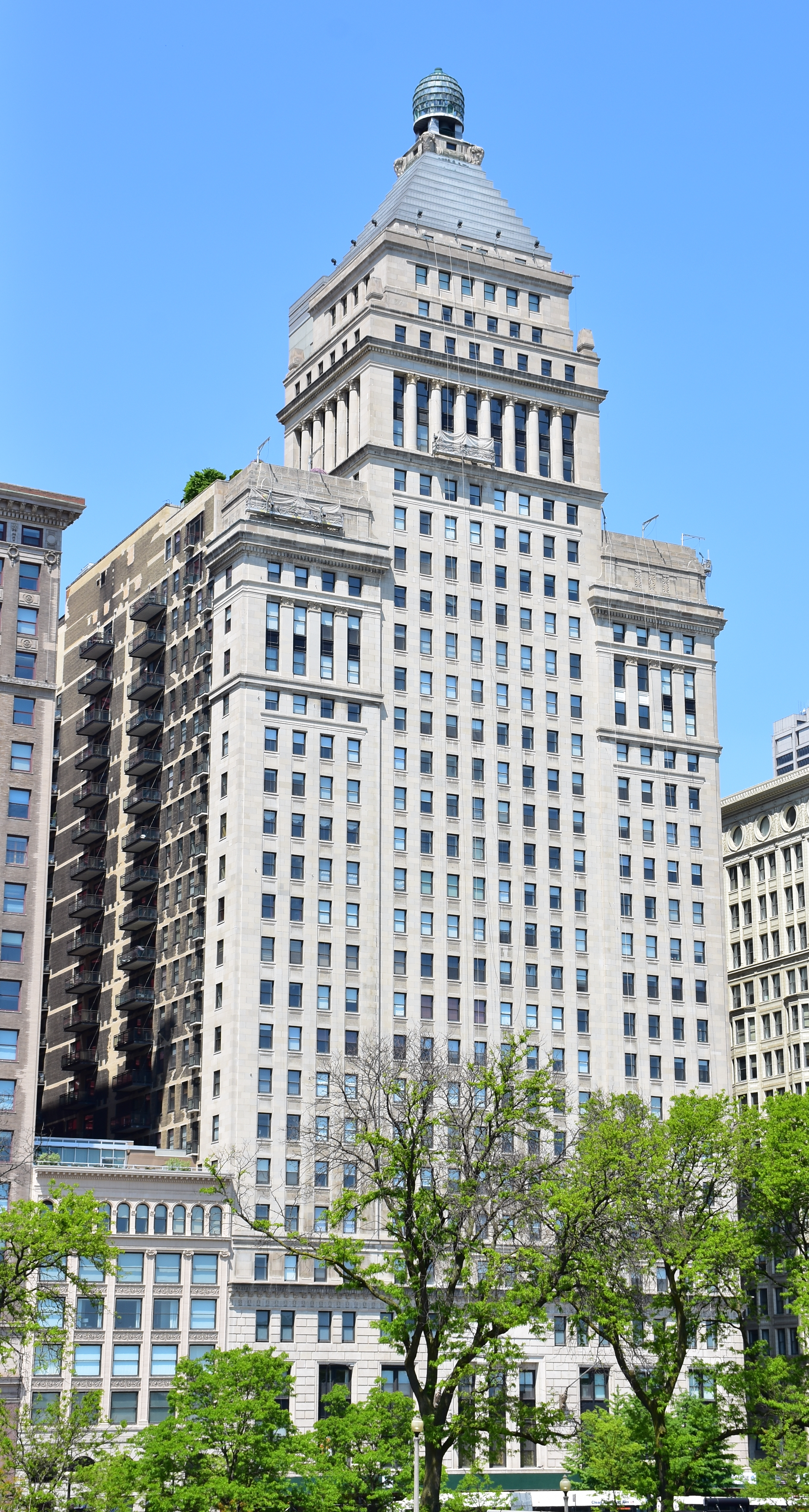
Metropolitan Tower in 2016

The Metropolitan Tower is a skyscraper located at 310 S. Michigan Avenue in Chicago's Historic Michigan Boulevard District in the Loop community area in Cook County, Illinois, United States. Developed by Metropolitan Properties of Chicago, it has been renovated as a condominium complex with 242 units. Residences range in size from 1,200 square feet (110 m^{2}) to 4,000 square feet (370 m^{2}). Penthouses feature 360 degree city views and private elevators. Prices run from $300,000 for a 762 square feet (70.8 m^{2}) one-bedroom unit to $1.365 million for a 1,932 square feet (179.5 m^{2}) three-bedroom. The Metropolitan Tower was also for a time home to a branch of Chase Bank. The space was also previously occupied by a CVS which has since closed.

== History ==
Designed by Graham, Anderson, Probst & White, the Metropolitan Tower was named the Straus Building when completed in 1924. Though it was the first building in Chicago with 30 or more floors, it was never officially designated Chicago's tallest building since the Chicago Temple Building, also completed in 1924, is taller by 92 feet (28 m) but has seven fewer floors. The Straus Building and the Chicago Temple Building were the first to take advantage of the 1923 zoning ordinance; before then, no building in Chicago could be taller than 260 feet (79 m).

The Metropolitan Tower was at one time called the Continental National Insurance Company Building (later Continental Center I). From 1980 to 2004 it was called the Britannica Building when that company was its tenant.

== Characteristics, past and present ==
This 30 story building, standing at 475 feet (145 m) in height, fronts Chicago's Michigan Avenue and Grant Park. The 40-foot (12 m) pyramid at the top of the building (which Schulze & Harrington, authors of Chicago's Famous Buildings, compare with the Tomb of Mausolus at Halicarnassus), with its new zinc-coated stainless steel sheathing, is peaked by a 20-foot (6 m) glass "beehive" ornament containing a blue glass box filled with six 1000-watt lightbulbs which emits a deep blue light, a prominent feature of Chicago's nighttime skyline. The beehive is supported by four limestone bisons. Because of this ornament, the building is sometimes referred to as the "Beehive Building."

Just beneath the beehive are four carillon bells ranging in weight from 1,500 to 7,000 pounds, unused for many years until restored in 1979 for the Chicago visit of Pope John Paul II. At one time, the bells chimed the well-known Cambridge Quarters on the quarter-hours. The base has been altered from its original design: rectangular window openings replaced giant arches on Michigan Avenue and Jackson Boulevard. At one time, the thirtieth floor was the Straus Tower Observatory, which was open to the public for viewing the city.

The original main entrance was a pair of elaborately carved bronze doors set in a marble portal flanked by bas-reliefs and used to be in the center of the east side, through the largest of the archways.

In 2007, the building was converted into 234 condominium units. In 2009, the Metropolitan Tower won a "Best Adaptive Reuse" award from the Friends of Downtown, a planning and urban design organization for downtown Chicago. Amenities include: 24 hour lobby and maintenance staff; on-site management staff; deeded indoor parking; Amazon package delivery lockers; contractors storage area for remodeling projects; two hotel type guest suites; workout facilities with sauna, steam, and showers; children's playroom; extra storage opportunities and imagination rooms; and a two story event/party room with adjacent access to a rooftop garden deck including an outdoor grill and dining area for entertaining guests, with views of Millennium Park and Navy Pier Fireworks.

== Symbolism ==
The original owner of the Metropolitan Tower was S. W. Straus and Company, a dealer of investment bonds and one of the leading financers of major real estate in Chicago during the late 19th century and early 20th century. The tower's crown has many symbols for characteristics the company wanted to portray. The pyramid symbolized longevity and permanence and the beehive stood for industry and thrift. When first installed, the beehive also contained four directional beacons, a metaphor for the company's global reach. The pyramid is supported by the four bisons, a traditional symbol for the American West. Straus was hoping to use these symbols to instill trust in their customers, to reassure them that their investments would be handled actively and carefully by an institution that could be trusted over the long term. Ironically, the firm failed during the Great Depression and closed fewer than ten years after lighting the beacon.

== Area ==
The Metropolitan Tower is located a block from the entrance to the Art Institute and is within two blocks of stations for all downtown CTA train lines. The Symphony Center, Millennium Park, Harold Washington Library, and the Lake Michigan shore are within a half mile. The south end of the Magnificent Mile shopping district is less than a mile away. Dozens of fine restaurants and other eateries are in the neighborhood, and Grant Park is across the street.

== Position in Chicago's skyline ==
Metropolitan Tower appears in front of Chase Tower (Chicago) in the diagram below.

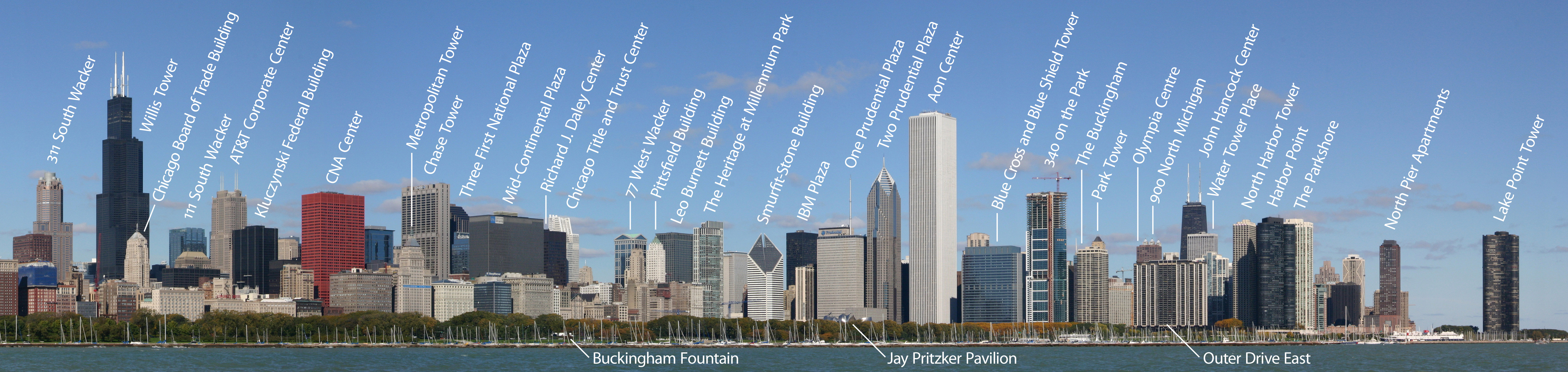
