= CNA Financial =

American insurance company

CNA Financial Corporation

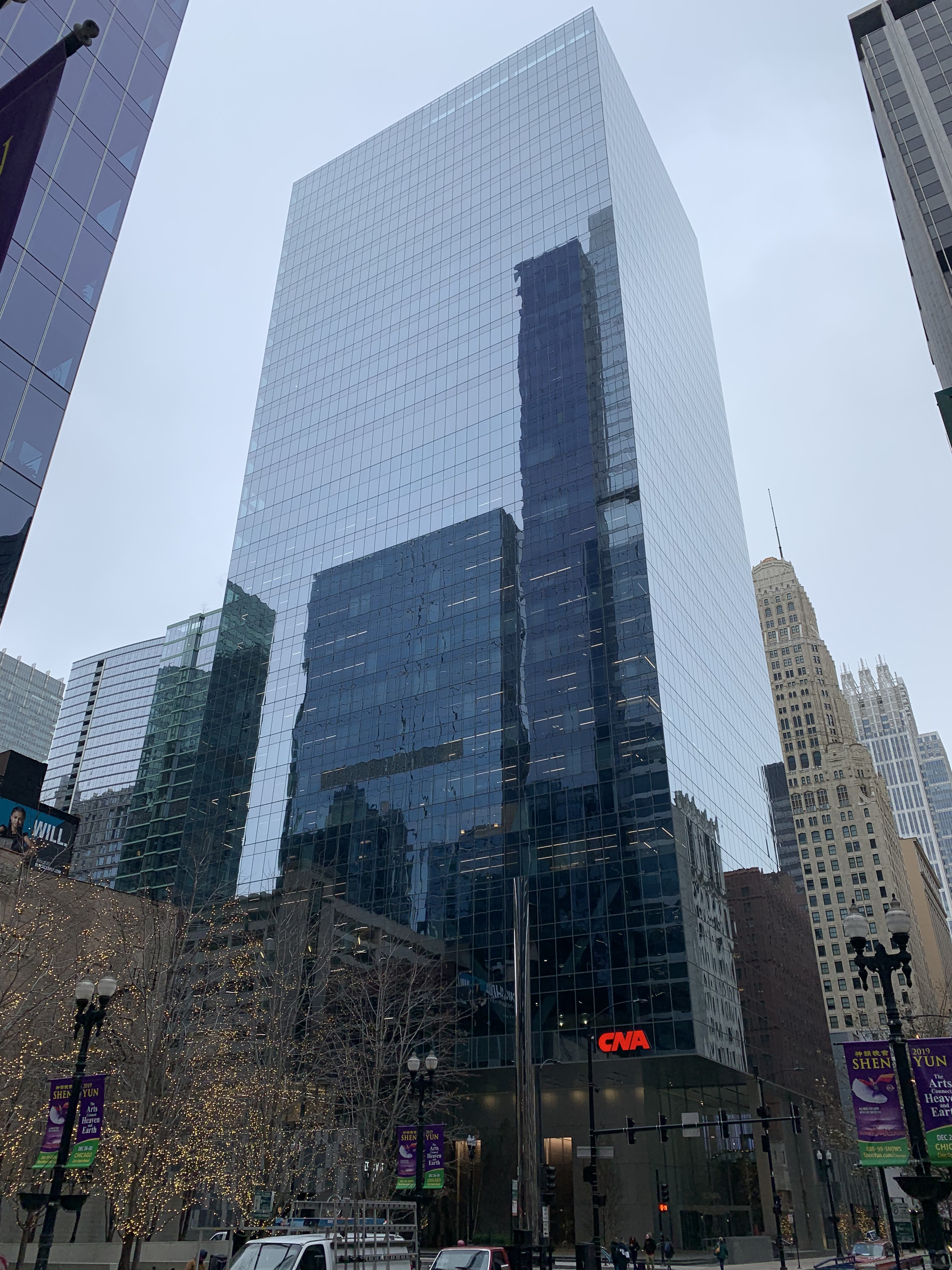
- Headquarters at 151 North Franklin
- Type: Public
- Traded as: NYSE: CNA; Russell 1000 component
- Industry: Insurance
- Founded: 1897; 129 years ago (as Continental Assurance Company of North America); Detroit, Michigan, U.S. 1967 (parent company)
- Headquarters: 151 North Franklin; Chicago, Illinois, U.S.
- Key people: Doug Worman (CEO)
- Revenue: ▲US$14.3 billion (2024)
- Operating income: ▼US$1.21 billion (2024)
- Net income: ▼US$959 million (2024)
- Total assets: ▲US$66.5 billion (2024)
- Total equity: ▲US$10.5 billion (2024)
- Owner: Loews Corporation (90%)
- Number of employees: 6,500 (2024)
- Website: www.cna.com

CNA Financial Corporation is a financial corporation based in Chicago, Illinois, United States. Its principal subsidiary, Continental Casualty Company (CCC), was founded in 1897, and The Continental Insurance Company (CIC) was organized in 1853. CNA, the current parent company, was incorporated in 1967.

CNA is the seventh largest commercial insurer in the United States as of 2018. CNA provides property and casualty insurance products and services for businesses and professionals in the U.S., Canada, and Europe.

CNA itself is 90% owned by a holding company, Loews Corporation. This holding company also has interests in offshore oil and gas drilling rigs, natural gas transmission pipelines, oil and gas exploration, hotel operations and package manufacturing.

== History ==
Continental Assurance Company of North America was founded in Detroit in 1897. The purpose of the company was to provide accident and health insurance to railroad industry employees. This company then merged with the Metropolitan Accident Company, changed its name to the Continental Casualty Company, and moved to Chicago. It acquired National Fire Insurance Company of Hartford in 1956, and the American Casualty Company in 1963. The first letters of each of the original companies were merged to form the acronym CNA. It was then referred to as the Continental National American Group, now it simply goes by CNA.

In 1915, CCC offered the first workers' compensation insurance. In the 1920s, CCC was the first to create a co-insurance clause on homeowners' policies. In the 1950s, CCC offered the industry's first comprehensive group dental insurance. In the 1960s, CNA introduced long-term care to the industry.

CNA has insured many historical events. Over the years, CNA covered the Indianapolis 500, the World Boxing Association, the Peking Opera, the Blue Angels, and various actors and movie projects. In the 1960s, CNA covered the Beatles concert in the event of inclement weather at Shea Stadium. In the 1970s, CNA covered U.S. astronauts in their Apollo 16 and Apollo 17 voyages to the moon with a commercial special risks package.

In 1974, Loews Corporation purchased 56% of CNA stock. In 1995, CNA completed a $1.1 billion merger with The Continental Corporation. The merger was the first significant merger of two property and casualty companies in more than 25 years.

In 1999, CNA sold its personal insurance division to Allstate. That personal insurance company is now Encompass Insurance Company, a subsidiary of Allstate. In 2002, CNA exited the life, group and reinsurance business.

On January 1, 2004, CNA sold its Group Benefits division to The Hartford, based in Hartford, Connecticut. The Hartford merged its new purchase with its own Group Benefits Division. With the sale of this division came the end of CNA's long history as a multi-line insurer.

In 2010, the company enters into an agreement with National Indemnity Co. (NICO), a subsidiary of Berkshire Hathaway, under which all of CNA's legacy asbestos and environmental liabilities are transferred to NICO. (Source: Insurance Journal)

In 2011, CNA introduced the Customer Segment strategy, focusing on key customer segments — construction, financial institutions, healthcare, manufacturing, professional services, real estate (2014), technology and small business — and specialized monoline insurance products. CNA expands its digital presence in 2013 and its international footprint beginning in 2014.

In 2012, CNA entered the London market by buying "Hardys Underwriting" and re-branding it to CNA Hardy

From 1972 until 2018, CNA's headquarters was located at the CNA Center. In 2015, CNA made plans to move out of the CNA Center with plans to construct 151 North Franklin as its new headquarters. CNA relocated to 151 North Franklin in June 2018.

In February 2020, CNA announced the appointment of Al Miralles as the executive vice-president and chief financial officer. He succeeds James Anderson, who announced his resignation.

In March 2021, CNA was the target of a ransomware cyberattack. CNA paid more than $40 million in late March to regain control of its network after the ransomware attack. The Chicago-based company paid the hackers about two weeks after a trove of company data was stolen, and CNA officials were locked out of their network. In 2022, it was reported to be the largest disclosed ransomware payment at that time.

== Corporate affairs ==
=== Head Office Locations ===
CNA Financial Corporation is headquartered in Chicago, Illinois, United States. Its main offices are located in the CNA Center, a high-rise office building in the Loop community area of downtown Chicago that has long served as the company’s corporate headquarters.

In addition to its headquarters, CNA maintains regional offices across the United States and international offices in Canada, Europe, and Asia to support its insurance and reinsurance operations.

=== Financial performance ===
The key financial trends for CNA Financial Corporation are based on fiscal years ending December 31:

Year	Revenue (USD Billion)	Gross Profit (USD Billion)	Net Income (USD Billion)
1995	11.00	11.00	0.0365
2000	16.40	16.40	-0.130
2005	9.93	9.93	0.441
2010	8.47	8.47	0.419
2015	9.69	9.69	0.691
2020	10.81	10.81	0.690
2021	11.91	11.91	1.200
2022	11.88	11.88	0.894
2023	11.88	11.88	0.682
2024	13.30	13.13	1.210
