= Yang di-Pertuan Besar of Negeri Sembilan =

Royal title of the ruler of Negeri Sembilan, Malaysia

- Yang di-Pertuan Besar Negeri Sembilan يڠ دڤرتوان بسر نڬري سمبيلن
- State
- Royal Standard

Incumbent
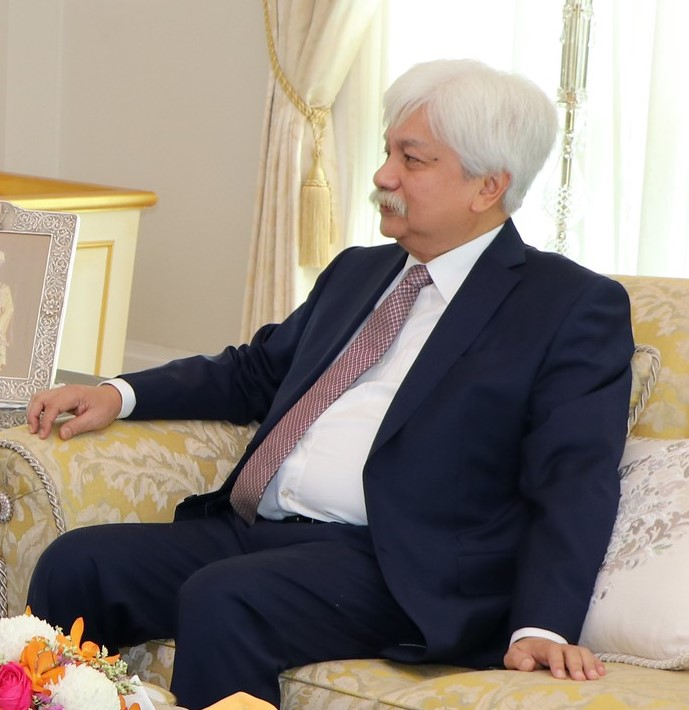
- Tuanku Muhriz Tuanku Munawir since 29 December 2008 (Note: The Undang Yang Empat did not recognize Tuanku Muhriz as the legitimate Yang di-Pertuan Besar of Negeri Sembilan since the 2026 Negeri Sembilan constitutional crisis and subsequent collective recognition by Negeri Sembilan EXCO committee under Ismail Lasim, and installed Tunku Nadzaruddin Tuanku Ja'afar as the new Yang di-Pertuan Besar. However, the installation was not recognized by the Federal Government, Negeri Sembilan state government under Aminuddin Harun or the Tunku Besar Seri Menanti. Tuanku Muhriz continues to have de jure rule over Negeri Sembilan.)

Co-incumbent
- Tuanku Nadzaruddin Tuanku Ja'afar since 19 April 2026

Details
- Style: His Royal Highness (Malay: Duli Yang Maha Mulia)
- First monarch: Raja Melewar Sultan Abdul Jalil
- Formed: 1773; 253 years ago
- Residences: Istana Besar, Seri Menanti
- Appointer: Undang Yang Empat

The Yang di-Pertuan Besar of Negeri Sembilan (Malay: Yang di-Pertuan Besar Negeri Sembilan; lit. "He Who Is Made a Great Lord"; Jawi: يڠ دڤرتوان بسر), also known as the Yamtuan Besar of Negeri Sembilan (Malay: Yamtuan Besar Negeri Sembilan; Jawi: يمتوان بسر), is the constitutional ruler of the Malaysian state of Negeri Sembilan.

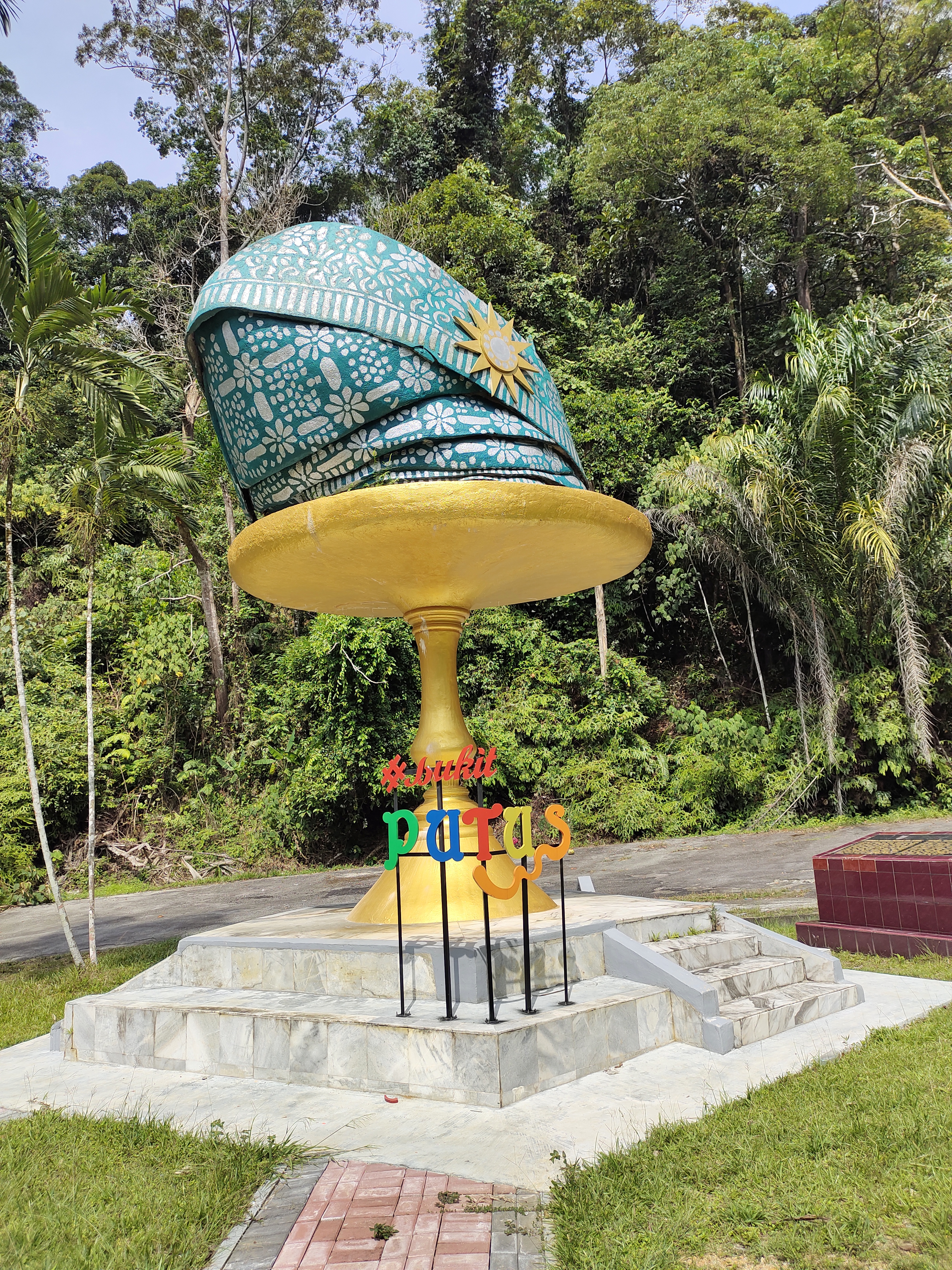
The Yamtuan Besar's official headgear is a destar tied in the solek (style) of Dendam Tak Sudah, as depicted in this picture of the replica of it in Bukit Putus.

Unlike other rulers of the Malay states, the Yang di-Pertuan Besar is elected rather than hereditary. The ruler is elected by a council of ruling chiefs in the state, known as the Undang Yang Empat, a royal practice that has been followed since 1773. The Yang di-Pertuan Besar is selected from among the four leading princes of Negeri Sembilan (Putera Yang Empat). The Undangs themselves cannot stand for election and their choice is limited to a male, Muslim Malay who is a descendant of Raja Radin ibni Raja Lenggang, the 4th Yang di-Pertuan Besar of Negeri Sembilan.

This unique form of government later inspired the first Prime Minister of Malaysia, Tunku Abdul Rahman to implement a form of rotational constitutional monarchy for a newly independent Federation of Malaya. Thus, the office of Yang di-Pertuan Agong was created.

== Early history ==
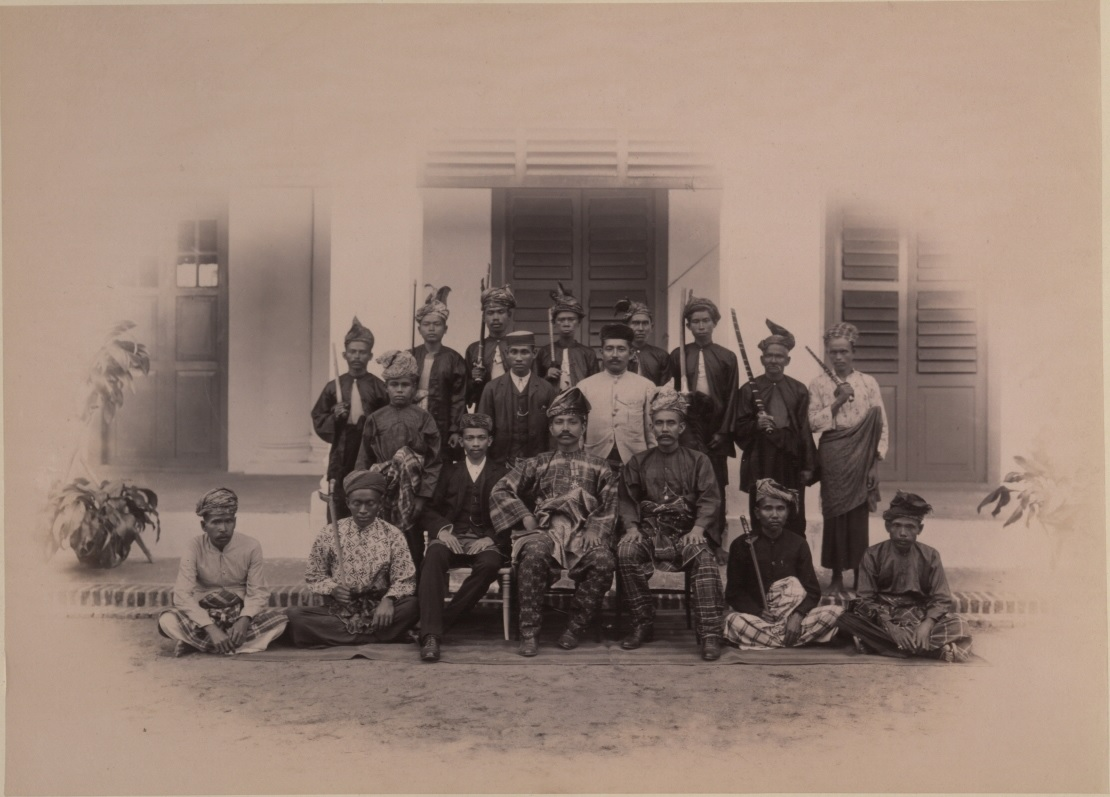
Tuanku Muhammad Shah (seated in the middle) with his personal attendants, 1897.

Negeri Sembilan has been receiving migrants from Sumatra for hundreds of years. Prior to the establishment of the Yamtuan Besar the area was ruled by the Sultan of Malacca. After Malacca was defeated by the Portuguese, it was ruled by the Sultanate of Johor.

Even during the 18th century, several groups of Minang people had expanded to the Malay Peninsula especially around the areas of Rembau, Naning and Sungai Ujong but retained strong links to their homeland in Sumatra. During this period, Rembau was under the nominal authority of Johor, until 1758 when it was ceded to the Dutch.

By 1760, Johor appointed Daeng Kemboja to lead Negeri Sembilan. However, his rule were not approved by the residence. Johor then decided to allow the state to find a leader from the Minangkabau people in Sumatra. Between 1760 and 1770, a council of leaders known as the penghulu luak (the predecessor of the Undangs) left for Pagar Ruyung in Minangkabau in search of a leader. Popular belief holds that the legendary Raja Melewar was elected in 1773 as the first ruler of Negeri Sembilan.

== Part of Minangkabau ==
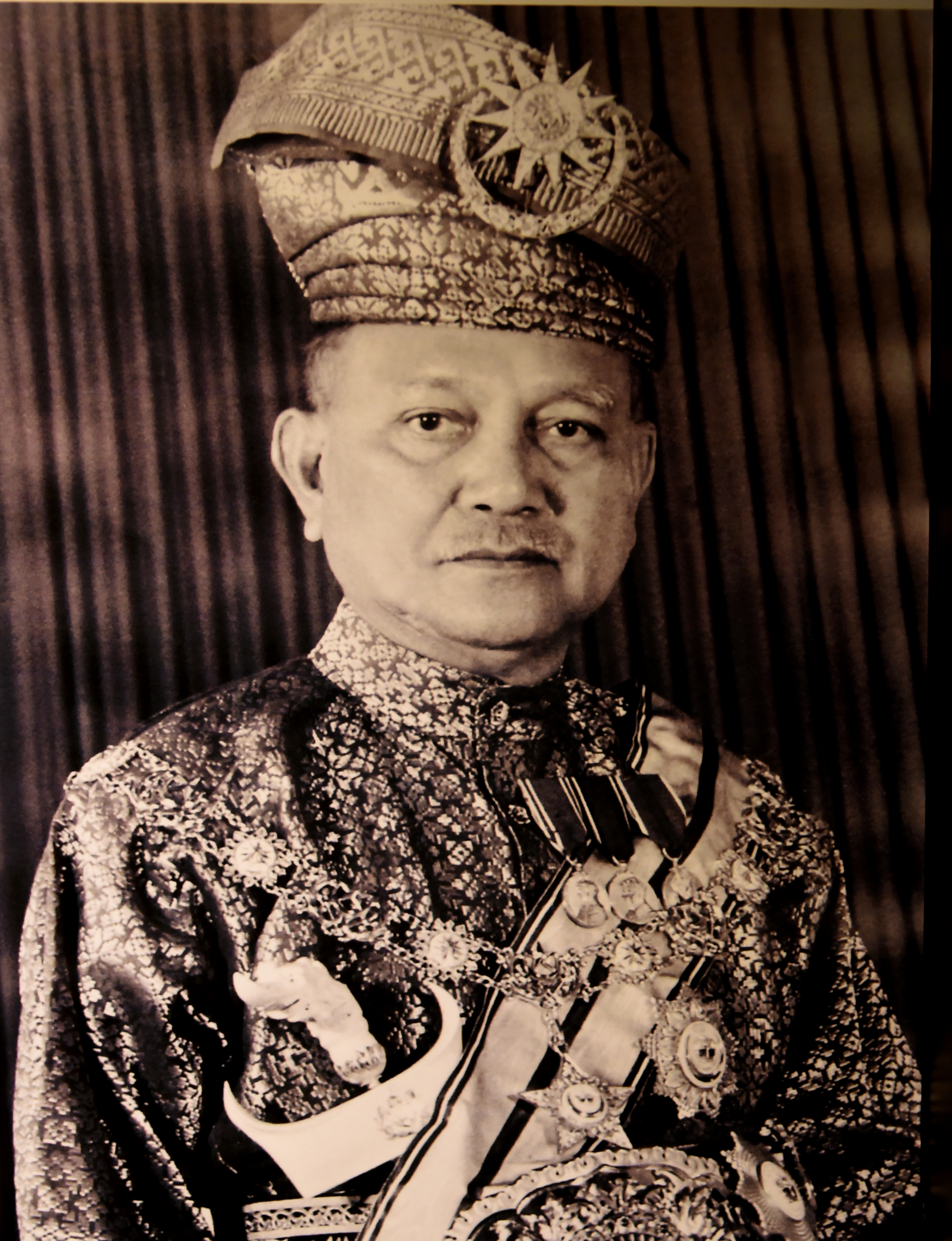
Tuanku Abdul Rahman, Yang di-Pertuan Besar VIII of Negeri Sembilan -and- Yang di-Pertuan Agong I of Malaya.

=== Yamtuan Melewar ===
The council of Sultan Malenggang Alam of Pagaruyung appointed his uncle, Raja Mahmud (Rajo Mangiang), to rule this new outpost of the Minangkabau region. Raja Mahmud was grandson of Sultan Alif II of Pagaruyung. He later became known as Raja Melewar upon ascension to Negeri Sembilan's throne.

Prior to Raja Melewar, the districts were separately vying for power against each other while a greater problem of interference, incursions and invasion loomed over them from Bugis controlled Johor and Selangor. All this amid the stream of pretenders claiming the throne, including Raja Kasah, Raja 'Adil and Raja Khatib.

Raja Melewar is credited with the successful unification the main districts and numerous outlying settlements into a cohesive political state now known as Negeri Sembilan. He was installed as the first Yamtuan Besar of Negeri Sembilan at Penajis in Rembau with the endorsement of all the territorial chiefs. He ruled as Yamtuan from 1773 until his death in 1795.

=== Yamtuan Hitam ===
Following the death of Raja Melewar in 1795, the same council of leaders once again set out on a journey to Sumatra. By this time, Negeri Sembilan had risen in importance in the Minangkabau region. In 1795, the council of Sultan Muning Syah III of Pagaruyung appointed his uncle, Raja Hitam (Rajo Samik II), as Yamtuan Besar. Raja Hitam was son of Sultan Bagagar Syah I of Pagaruyung. Following the Minangkabau matrilineal tradition, Raja Hitam married Raja Melewar's daughter, Tunku Aishah, but they had no children. As a diplomatic gesture, Raja Hitam also married the widow of the brother of Sultan Ibrahim of Selangor; having four children, including a daughter, Tunku Ngah. He died in 1808.

=== Yamtuan Lenggang ===
Once again in 1808, the leaders of Negeri Sembilan went to Minangkabau in search of someone to replace their leader. At this time, the Minangkabau Confederacy was in the middle of the Padri War against religious militant extremists promoting Wahhabism. The council of Sultan Bagagar Syah III (Sultan Tangkal Alam Bagagar & Muning Syah V) of Pagar Ruyung appointed his uncle, Raja (Ali) Lenggang Laut. Raja Lenggang was the son of Sultan Malenggang Alam of Pagaruyung. Yamtuan Lenggang established the royal residence at the town of Seri Menanti. He married Raja Hitam's second daughter, Tunku Ngah. They had two sons: Tunku Nasiruddin and Tunku Ullin, who would later become the fourth and fifth Yamtuan Besar as Yamtuan Radin and Yamtuan Imam. Yamtuan Lenggang died in 1824.

=== End of the Dynasty in Minangkabau ===
In 1824, the Undangs could not embark on a trip to meet the Raja of Pagaruyung because, the Pagaruyung dynasty had been destroyed during the Padri War. Dutch military forces took possession of Minangkabau territories in 1821. Thus, for the first time in its history, Negeri Sembilan would have its own hereditary leader to continue the Pagaruyung dynasty.

== Late history ==
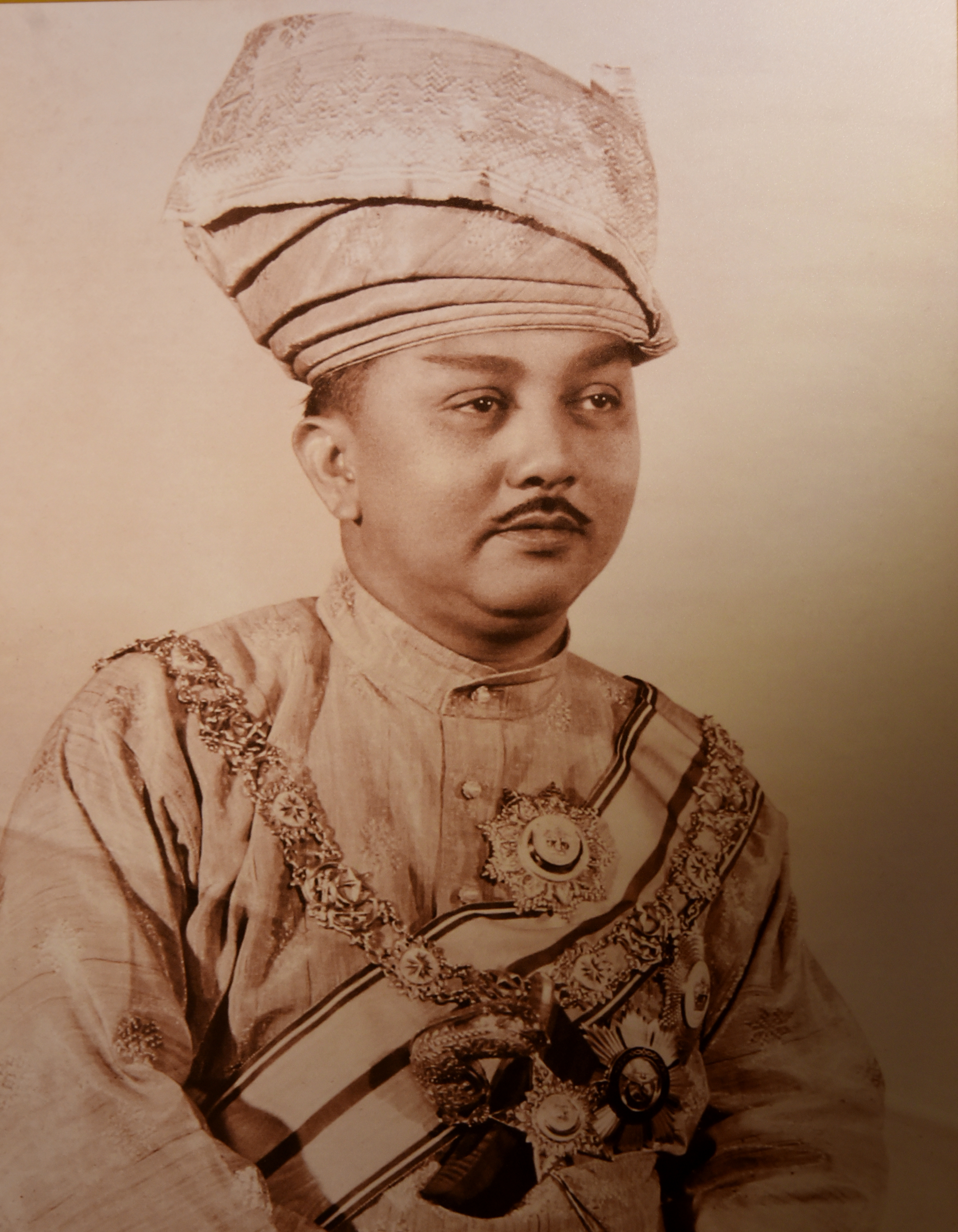
Tuanku Munawir, Yang di-Pertuan Besar IX of Negeri Sembilan.

Late history covers the period of flux; after the fall of the Pagaruyung dynasty in west Sumatra and before the constitutional era.

=== Yamtuan Radin ===
As the Pagaruyung Kingdom was in tatters in west Sumatra, Yamtuan Lenggang looked to continue the dynasty with what was left in Negeri Sembilan. He proposed his young son, Tunku Nasiruddin (Raja Radin/Raden), to be the next Yamtuan but the Undangs were hesitant.

After he died, there were five claimants to the throne:

- Raja Kerjan (proxy for Sungai Ujong chief),
- Raja Sati (Laboh) sent from Siak (also proxy for Sungai Ujong),
- Raja Ali, nephew of Sultan Ibrahim of Selangor
- Raja Radin
- Raja Beringin, self-appointed guardian of Radin.

Raja Beringin was largely ignored; while Raja Sati bickered against his benefactor and was removed. In 1832, the Negri chiefs objected when Raja Ali declared himself Yamtuan and his son-in-law, Sayid Sha'ban as Yamtuan Muda. Ali and Sha'ban went to war with the Linggi chief and attempted the murder of the Undang of Rembau. The Negri chiefs abandoned their machinations, rallied around Raja Radin, elected him to the Seri Menanti throne and went to war against Ali and Sha'ban. Raja Ali was driven out; Sha'ban eventually became the Tunku Besar (chief) of Tampin; while Raja Kerjan was later killed by the Temenggong of Muar for stealing buffalo.

With the appointment of Yamtuan Radin, the bloodline to the Minangkabau Pagaruyung dynasty remained unbroken. Yamtuan Radin ruled for 30 years before he died in 1861.

=== Yamtuan Imam ===
After the death of Yamtuan Radin, his son Tunku Antah was quite young and after some consternation among the Negri chiefs, they appointed the late Yamtuan's brother, Tunku Ullin as Yamtuan in 1861, reigning under the name Imam. Yamtuan Imam ruled for eight years and died in 1869. He was begotten with five sons: Tunku Ahmad Tunggal, Tunku Jumaat, Tunku Ma'adin, Tunku Alim and Tunku Alam; and a daughter, Tunku Chindai.

=== Yamtuan Antah ===
Upon the death of Yamtuan Imam, the two claimants to the throne were Tunku Antah, the son of Yamtuan Radin; and his cousin, Tunku Ahmad Tunggal, son of Yamtuan Imam. With no consensus forthcoming, Datuk Siamang Gagap elevated the queen dowager of Yamtuan Radin, Tunku Puan Intan as the Regent from 1869 to 1872.

The Undang of Johol supported Tunku Antah; the Undang of Sungai Ujong was backing Tunku Ahmad Tunggal; the Undang of Jelebu was undecided with their own problems; the Undang of Rembau wanted their own independence. After 3 years of wrangling, Tunku Antah was elected as Yamtuan in 1875.

During this time, the British administration was attempting to obtain border treaties and commercial agreements with all the polities in the Malay Peninsula. The Undang of Sungai Ujong signed with the British but without any reference to the ruler nor the other Undangs. This eventually culminated into the 1876 Battle of Bukit Putus wherein the united forces of Negeri Sembilan attacked the British protecting Sungai Ujong. Yamtuan Antah's forces were eventually defeated by British infantry and artillery. Yamtuan Antah surrendered to the British in Johor and was demoted to "Yamtuan Seri Menanti" but he was still determined to obtain an equitable agreement for the entire state. At the urging of the Sultan of Johor, the Governor of the Straits Settlements agreed to reconcile the dispute between Sungai Ujong and the other districts. Suggestions to the British from the Undang of Sungai Ujong amongst others was the installation of a new Sultan (from Muar) and appointing Tunku Ahmad Tunggal as "Malay Captain" for all territories except Sungai Ujong. By 1877, every district and territory in Negeri Sembilan had separate agreements with the British which included arbitration by the Sultan of Johor; but this proved unworkable. In 1887, witnessed by the British Governor of the Straits Settlements, a new agreement was signed by the chiefs of Johol, Ineh, Ulu Muar, Jempol, Terachi and Gunung Pasir. Through this agreement, these territorial chiefs acknowledge and ratify Yamtuan Antah as Yamtuan Seri Menanti; the ruler of the Seri Menanti Confederacy.

Yamtuan Antah died in 1888, a victim of a smallpox epidemic.

== Modern history ==
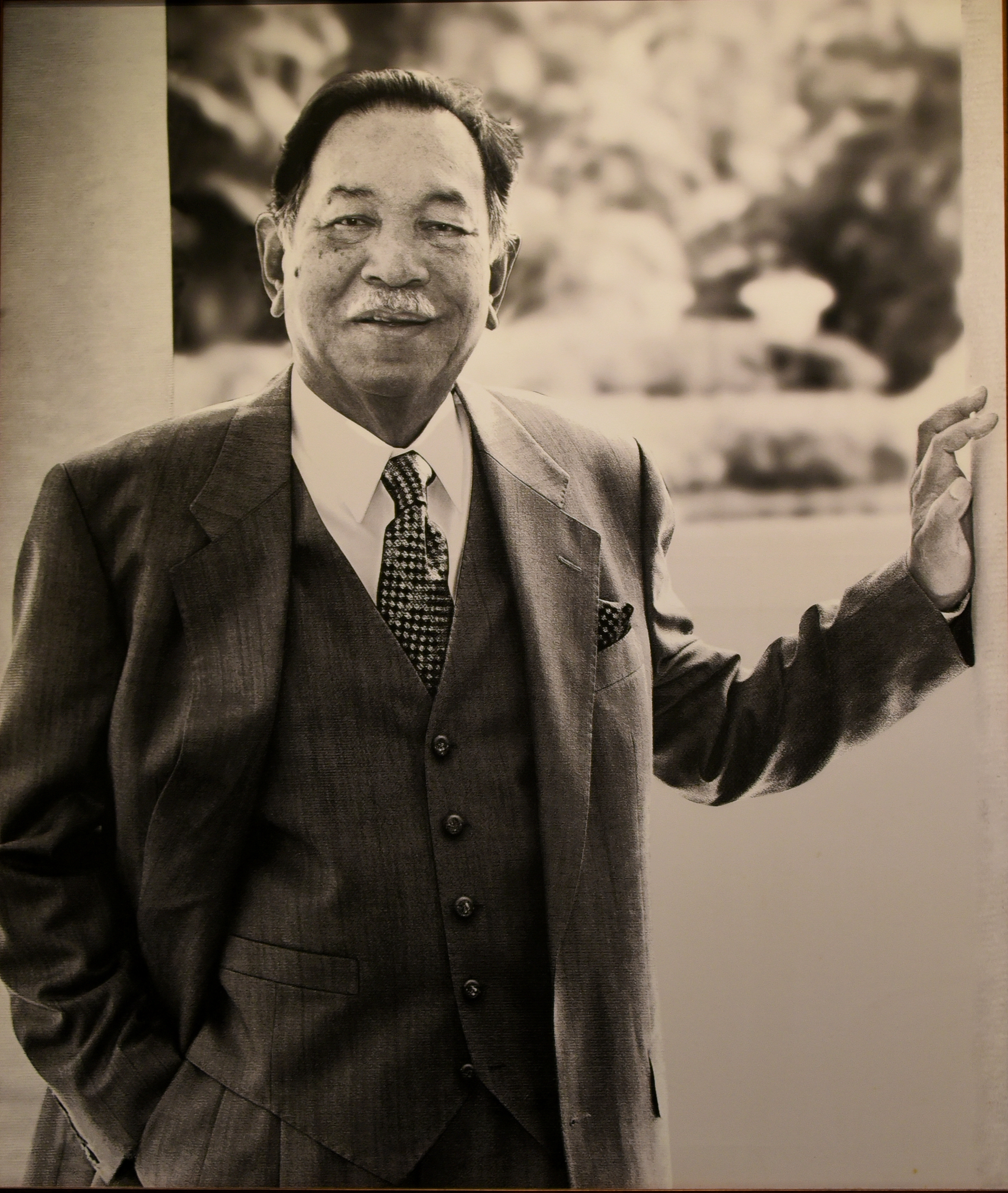
Tuanku Ja'afar, Yang di-Pertuan Besar X of Negeri Sembilan -and- Yang di-Pertuan Agong X of Malaysia.

=== Tuanku Muhammad ===
In 1888, the son of Yamtuan Antah, Tuanku Muhammad Shah took on the title of Tuanku at age 22 and acceded to the name and title of Yang di-Pertuan Besar of the Seri Menanti Confederacy. In 1889, under his reign, the districts of Rembau and Tampin joined the Confederacy to bear the historic name of the Nine States – Negeri Sembilan.

With the final two districts admitted into the state, on 29 April 1898, he was installed as the Yang di-Pertuan Besar of Negeri Sembilan. This marks the formal adoption of a State Constitution wherein the chiefs of territories of Jelebu, Johol, Sungai Ujong and Rembau were officially elevated to the status of Undang; and the Yamtuan would exercise direct control over the districts of Gunung Pasir, Ineh, Jempol, Terachi and Ulu Muar. The Undang of the four territories were officially declared royal electors cementing the elective nature of the state monarchy. Tuanku Muhammad died in 1933 after a long reign as Yamtuan Besar, the longest in the history of the state.

=== Tuanku Abdul Rahman ===
Tuanku Abdul Rahman, the son of Tuanku Muhammad, became the Yang di-Pertuan Besar in 1933.

In 1957, Tuanku Abdul Rahman was elected as the first Yang di-Pertuan Agong of Malaya.

His process of election by the Conference of Rulers, similar to that which elected him as Yamtuan Besar, would become the official process of election of all future Yang di-Pertuan Agong. During this time, his brother Tunku Laksamana Nasir was appointed regent. Tuanku Abdul Rahman died in 1960.

=== Tuanku Munawir ===
Tuanku Abdul Rahman's son, Tuanku Munawir, ascended the throne in 1960 and ruled until 1967.

=== Tuanku Ja'afar ===
When Tuanku Munawir died, his brother, Tuanku Ja'afar Tuanku Abdul Rahman, became the ruler of Negri Sembilan, by-passing Munawir's son Muhriz of Negeri Sembilan, who at 19 years of age was a minor. Tuanku Jaafar also served as the tenth Yang di-Pertuan Agong of Malaysia. During this period, Negeri Sembilan was ruled by the regent, Tunku Laxamana Tunku Naquiyuddin.

=== Tuanku Muhriz ===
On the death of Tuanku Ja'afar in 2008, the Undang Yang Empat elected Tuanku Muhriz, the eldest son of Tuanku Munawir and nephew of Tuanku Ja'afar. His election was a return to the traditional (male-preference primogeniture) line of succession, Adat Temenggong, as he had been bypassed in 1967 in favor of his uncle.

On 19 April 2026, the Undangs collectively announced the removal of Tuanku Muhriz due to alleged misconduct and named Tunku Panglima Besar of Negeri Sembilan, Tunku Nadzaruddin, the third son of Tuanku Ja'afar, as the 12th Yang di-Pertuan Besar at the Balai Undang Luak Sungei Ujong. However, the state government rejected the declaration as Dato' Mubarak Dohak, who signed and read the declaration, possesses no authority as Undang of Sungei Ujong after he was removed from the position effective 13 May 2025 for violating sharia laws and local customs. On 5 June, Tunku Nadzaruddin was proclaimed as the 12th Yang di-Pertuan Besar by the Undang of Jelebu, Maarof Mat Rashad, who represented the other three Undangs, at the Parkroyal A'Famosa Resort, Alor Gajah, Malacca. This came after a commotion at the Tunku Besar of Tampin's official residence earlier on the same day, where the four Undangs were denied entry by the police but was later allowed in after the Tunku Besar himself, Syed Razman Syed Idrus al-Qadri, instructed them to enable admission. The ceremony took place at the said resort after the police obstructed Tunku Nadzaruddin from leaving the resort to go to the Tunku Besar Tampin's official residence for the ceremony. Immediately after, Prime Minister Anwar Ibrahim announced that the federal government still recognises Tuanku Muhriz as the rightful Yang di-Pertuan Besar and that constitutional disputes must be resolved through lawful and established channels. The Comptroller of the Royal Household later declared that the proclamation of Tunku Nadzaruddin as illegal and that his title of Tunku Panglima Besar has been relinquished for his attempt to accept an illegal title.

== Election of Yang di-Pertuan Besar ==
Negeri Sembilan follows the Minangkabau tradition of selecting its ruler through a consensus of the noble chiefs. For Negeri Sembilan, the State Constitution assigns to the four Undangs (chiefs) the choice of successor of the Yamtuan; from the surviving male issue or close relatives . However, as per Palace protocol, four eligible titled-princes (Putera Yang Empat) are offered as candidates.

Extract from "The Laws of the Constitution of Negeri Sembilan, 1959":

Chapter 3: THE YANG DI-PERTUAN BESAR

VII. (1) There shall be a Yang di-Pertuan Besar of the State to exercise the functions and powers of a Ruler in accordance with this Constitution and who shall take precedence over all other persons in the State.

(2) The Yang di-Pertuan Besar shall be such person as shall be elected by the Undangs of the territories of Sungai Ujong, Jelebu, Johol and Rembau in the manner hereinafter provided and in accordance with the custom of the State.

(3) No person shall be elected as Yang di-Pertuan Besar of the State unless He shall be a male of the Malay race, of sound mind and professing the religion of the State, who is a lawfully-begotten descendant in the male line of Raja Radin ibni Raja Lenggang.

(4) Upon the death of a Yang di-Pertuan Besar, leaving male issue him surviving, the Undangs of the territories of Sungai Ujong, Jelebu, Johol and Rembau shall forthwith choose a successor from the said male issue:

Provided that if, in the opinion of the said Undangs, there is no suitable and competent person among the said male issue, then a person shall be chosen from the first of the following classes or failing, in their opinion any suitable and competent person in that class, then from the second and subsequent classes in the order stated, that is to say–

Firstly, the brothers of the deceased Yang di-Pertuan Besar;
Secondly, the paternal uncles of the deceased Yang di-Pertuan Besar;
Thirdly, the grandsons of the deceased Yang di-Pertuan Besar;
Fourthly, the sons of the brothers of the deceased Yang di-Pertuan Besar;
Fifthly, the sons of the paternal uncles of the deceased Yang di-Pertuan Besar.

In the 18th century, when the office of Yamtuan Besar was still in its infancy, it was the penghulu of Tanah Mengandung and not the Undang who were influential in the choice of the incumbent.

== List of Yang di-Pertuan Besar of Negeri Sembilan ==
=== Pagaruyung Dynasty ===
List of Yang di-Pertuan Besar of Negeri Sembilan
Title	Name	Start reign	End reign	Time in reign	Succession and relationship	Notes
1st Yamtuan Besar of Negeri Sembilan	Raja Mahmud ibni Almarhum Sultan Abdul Jalil	1773	1795	22 years	Grandson of Sultan Alif II of Pagaruyung	Died 1795
2nd Yamtuan Besar of Negeri Sembilan	Raja Hitam ibni Almarhum Sultan Bagagar Syah I	1795	1808	13 years	Son-in-law of Raja Mahmud	Died 1808
3rd Yamtuan Besar of Negeri Sembilan	Raja Ali ibni Almarhum Sultan Malenggang Alam	1808	1824	16 years	Son-in-law of Raja Hitam	Died 1824
4th Yamtuan Besar of Negeri Sembilan	Tuanku Nasiruddin ibni Almarhum Raja Ali	1824	1861	37 years	Son of Raja Ali	Died 1861
5th Yamtuan Besar of Negeri Sembilan	Tuanku Ullin ibni Almarhum Raja Ali	1861	1869	8 years	Son of Raja Ali	Died 1869
Queen Regent	Tunku Ampuan Intan binti Almarhum Tunku Alang Husain	1869	1872	3 years	Widow of Tuanku Nasiruddin and mother of Tuanku Antah	—
After the 5th Yamtuan of Negeri Sembilan, Tuanku Ullin ibni Almarhum Raja Ali died in 1869, Tunku Ampuan Intan binti Almarhum Tunku Alang Husain acted as the Regent (Malay: Pemangku Yamtuan Besar Negeri Sembilan) until 1872. Following her regency, a succession dispute broke out between Yamtuan Imam's son, Tunku Ahmad Tunggal ibni Tuanku Ullin and Yamtuan Radin's son, Tunku Antah ibni Tuanku Nasiruddin.
6th Yamtuan Besar of Negeri Sembilan / Yamtuan Besar of Seri Menanti	Tuanku Antah ibni Almarhum Tuanku Nasiruddin	1874	22 October 1888	14 years	Son of Tuanku Nasiruddin and Tuanku Ampuan Intan	Died 1888
7th Yang di-Pertuan Besar of Seri Menanti / Yang di-Pertuan Besar of Negeri Sembilan	Tuanku Muhammad ibni Almarhum Tuanku Antah	22 October 1888	1 August 1933	44 years, 283 days	Son of Tuanku Antah	Died 1933
8th Yang di-Pertuan Besar of Negeri Sembilan	Tuanku Abdul Rahman ibni Almarhum Tuanku Muhammad	3 August 1933	1 April 1960	26 years, 242 days	Son of Tuanku Muhammad	Also 1st Yang di-Pertuan Agong; Died 1960
9th Yang di-Pertuan Besar of Negeri Sembilan	Tuanku Munawir ibni Almarhum Tuanku Abdul Rahman	5 April 1960	26 October 1966	6 years, 204 days	Son of Tuanku Abdul Rahman	Died 1967
Regency Council of Negeri Sembilan	Consisted of 3 members: Tuanku Muhriz ibni Almarhum Tuanku Munawir (chairman), Tunku Nasir Alam ibni Almarhum Tuanku Muhammad Shah and Tunku Abdullah ibni Almarhum Tuanku Abdul Rahman	26 October 1966	17 November 1966	22 days	—	—
9th Yang di-Pertuan Besar of Negeri Sembilan	Tuanku Munawir ibni Almarhum Tuanku Abdul Rahman	17 November 1966	14 April 1967	148 days	Son of Tuanku Abdul Rahman	Died 1967
10th Yang di-Pertuan Besar of Negeri Sembilan	Tuanku Ja'afar ibni Almarhum Tuanku Abdul Rahman	18 April 1967	27 December 2008	41 years, 253 days	Son of Tuanku Abdul Rahman	Also 10th Yang di-Pertuan Agong; Died 2008
11th Yang di-Pertuan Besar of Negeri Sembilan	Tuanku Muhriz ibni Almarhum Tuanku Munawir	29 December 2008	Present	17 years, 328 days	Son of Tuanku Munawir	Disputed (Note: Recognised by the Federal Government and Dewan Keadilan dan Undang.)
12th Yang di-Pertuan Besar of Negeri Sembilan	Tuanku Nadzaruddin ibni Almarhum Tuanku Ja'afar	19 April 2026	Present	217 days	Son of Tuanku Ja'afar	Disputed (Note: Declared by Undang Yang Empat. However, it was rejected by the Federal Government, Istana Besar Seri Menanti and Dewan Keadilan dan Undang.)

=== Timeline ===
As of 22 November 2026.

== See also ==
- Elective monarchy
- Monarchies of Malaysia
- Family tree of Negeri Sembilan monarchs
- Family tree of Malaysian monarchs
