= Negeri Sembilan State Route N29 =

Road in Malaysia

Negeri Sembilan Route 29
- Jalan Terachi–Seri Menanti

Major junctions
- North end: Terachi
- FT 51 Federal Route 51; N24 State Route N24
- South end: Seri Menanti

Location
- Country: Malaysia
- Primary destinations: Terachi, Seri Menanti

Highway system
- Highways in Malaysia; Expressways; Federal; State

Jalan Terachi-Seri Menanti, Negeri Sembilan State Route N29 is a major road in Negeri Sembilan, Malaysia. It is also one of two main routes to Seri Menanti royal town from Seremban, the other being Jalan Tanjung Ipoh-Senaling. However, this route is the shorter route to Seri Menanti and therefore is more popular for people visiting the royal town. This road is also home to the Royal Seri Menanti Golf & Country Club.

== Junction lists ==
The entire route is located in Kuala Pilah District, Negeri Sembilan.

Legend:

- I/C - Interchange, I/S - Intersection, RSA - Rest and service area, OBR - Overhead bridge restaurant, R/R - Restaurant and rest plaza, L/B - Layby, V/P - Vista point, TN - tunnel, T/P - Toll plaza, BR - Bridge
- C - Cloverleaf, S - Stack, T-A - Trumpet-A, T-B - Trumpet-B, DT - Directional-T/Y, SDT - Semi-Directional-T/Y, P-Y - Partial-Y, D - Diamond, P-C - Partial cloverleaf, D-D - Diverging diamond, D-R - Direct ramp

Location	km	Name	Destinations	Notes
Terachi		Terachi	FT 51 Malaysia Federal Route 51 – Seremban, Kuala Lumpur, Ulu Bendol Recreation Area, Kuala Pilah, Tanjung Ipoh, Kampung Ayer Hitam	Junctions
Seri Menanti		Seri Menanti Minangkabau Arch		
Seri Menanti		Ayer Sejok		
Seri Menanti		Seri Menanti New Palace		
Seri Menanti		Seri Menanti	N24 Negeri Sembilan State Route N24 – Seri Menanti Old Palace, Tuanku Munawir Royal Mosque, Seri Menanti Royal Mausoleum, Tanjung Ipoh, Kuala Pilah, Ulu Pilah, Senaling	T-junctions
1.000 mi = 1.609 km; 1.000 km = 0.621 mi
