= Family tree of Negri monarchs =

Family tree of Malaysian state monarchy

The following is the family tree of the Malay monarchs of Negeri Sembilan, from the establishment of the chieftaincy in 1773 to the present day. The monarch is styled Yang di-Pertuan Besar or shortened as Yamtuan Besar ('the grand ruler'). The first three monarchs namely, Melewar, Hitam and Lenggang came from Pagaruyung in Sumatra, and were invited to rule the confederacy of Minangkabau Luaks of Negeri Sembilan. The accession of the locally-born Radin marked the end of the practice of inviting princes from Pagaruyung.

House of Royal Pagaruyung-Negeri Sembila

Melewar^{(1)} r. 1773–1795	♀Cik Sani
♀Jingka	Hitam^{(2)} r. 1795–1808	♀Tunku Aisha
Tunku Husain	♀Tunku Puan; Ngah	Lenggang^{(3)} r. 1808–1824
♀Tunku; Puan Intan regent r. 1869–1872	Radin^{(4)} r. 1831–1861	Imam^{(5)} r. 1861–1869
Antah^{(6)} r. 1869–1888
Muhammad^{(7)} r. 1888–1933	Tunku Burhanuddin; Tunku Besar; Seri Menanti d. 1961
Abdul Rahman^{(8)} r. 1933–1960; YDP Agong I r. 1957–1960	Tunku Kurshiah; Tunku Ampuan Besar r. 1934–1960; Raja Permaisuri Agong I r. 1957–1960
House of Mahawangsa
Munawir^{(9)} r. 1960–1967	Tunku Durah; Tunku Ampuan Besar r. 1960–1967	Ja'afar^{(10)} r. 1967–2008; YDP Agong X r. 1994–1999	Tuanku Najihah; Tunku Ampuan Besar r. 1967–2008; Raja Permaisuri Agong X r. 1994–1999	Sultanah Bahiyah; Sultanah Kedah r. 1958–2003; Raja Permaisuri Agong V r. 1970–1975	Abdul Halim; Sultan Kedah r. 1958–2017; YDP Agong V r. 1970–1975; YDP Agong XIV r. 2011–2016
Muhriz^{(11)} r. 2008–present
Tunku Ali Redhauddin; Tunku Besar; Seri Menanti

== Bibliography ==
- Ahmad Sarji Abdul Hamid (2011), The Encyclopedia of Malaysia, vol. 16 - The Rulers of Malaysia, Editions Didier Millet, ISBN 978-981-3018-54-9
- Buyong Adil (1981), Sejarah Negeri Sembilan (History of Negeri Sembilan), Dewan Bahasa dan Pustaka.
