= Tunku Laksamana Nasir =

Tunku Nasir
- Tunku Laksamana of Negeri Sembilan
- Reign: 2 September 1957 - 1 April 1960
- Successor: Tunku Naquiyuddin
- Died: 22 January 1977; Seri Menanti, Negeri Sembilan, Malaysia
- Burial: 23 January 1977; Seri Menanti Royal Mausoleum
- House: Pagaruyung-Negeri Sembilan
- Father: Tuanku Muhammad Shah ibni Almarhum Tuanku Antah
- Religion: Sunni Islam

Tunku Laksamana Nasir Alam ibni Tuanku Muhammad Shah (died 22 January 1977) was a member of the Negeri Sembilan royal family who served as Regent of Negeri Sembilan from 2 September 1957 to 1 April 1960. He was one of the sons of Tuanku Muhammad Shah, the seventh Yang di-Pertuan Besar of Negeri Sembilan, and held the royal title of Tunku Laksamana, one of the four hereditary positions in the Negeri Sembilan succession system.

== Early life and family background ==
Tunku Laksamana Nasir was born into the Negeri Sembilan royal family as one of the sons of Tuanku Sir Muhammad Shah ibni Almarhum Tuanku Antah, who reigned as the seventh Yang di-Pertuan Besar of Negeri Sembilan from 1888 to 1933.

Tunku Laksamana Nasir was the brother of Tuanku Abdul Rahman, who would later become both the eighth Yang di-Pertuan Besar of Negeri Sembilan and Malaysia's first Yang di-Pertuan Agong (King) following independence in 1957.

== Royal title and succession ==
Within the unique royal succession system of Negeri Sembilan, Tunku Laksamana Nasir held the title of Tunku Laksamana during the five-year tenure of his brother, Tuanku Abdul Rahman's term as Yang di-Pertuan Agong.

== Regency (1957–1960) ==
=== Appointment as Regent ===
When Tuanku Abdul Rahman was elected as the first Yang di-Pertuan Agong of independent Malaya on 31 August 1957, his ascension to the federal throne created a constitutional necessity for a regent in Negeri Sembilan. As Yang di-Pertuan Besar of Negeri Sembilan since 1933, Tuanku Abdul Rahman could not simultaneously fulfill his duties as the state's ruler while serving as the nation's constitutional monarch.

On 2 September 1957, Tunku Laksamana Nasir was appointed to serve as Regent of Negeri Sembilan during his brother's five-year term as Yang di-Pertuan Agong. This appointment came at a momentous time in Malaysian history—just two days after the Malayan Declaration of Independence, when the Federation of Malaya gained independence from British colonial rule at midnight on 31 August 1957.

=== Role during independence ===
The regency period coincided with the critical early years of Malayan independence. During this time, Negeri Sembilan, along with the other Malay states, was undergoing significant political and administrative transformation as the newly independent nation established its governmental structures and institutions.

As Regent, Tunku Laksamana Nasir assumed the executive powers of the Yang di-Pertuan Besar, serving as the Head of the Religion of Islam in the state and the fountain of all honor and dignity for Negeri Sembilan. His role was ceremonial and constitutional in nature, maintaining the continuity of royal authority in the state while his brother fulfilled national duties.

The regency demonstrated the flexibility and sophistication of Negeri Sembilan's constitutional monarchy system, which could adapt to the unique circumstance of having its ruler serve simultaneously as the federal monarch. This arrangement would be replicated in subsequent years when other state rulers were elected as Yang di-Pertuan Agong.

=== End of regency ===
Tunku Laksamana Nasir's regency came to an end on 1 April 1960, when Tuanku Abdul Rahman died in his sleep at the Istana Negara in Kuala Lumpur. The late ruler was buried at the Seri Menanti Royal Mausoleum on 5 April 1960. Following the death of Tuanku Abdul Rahman, the Undang Yang Empat elected his son, Tuanku Munawir, as the ninth Yang di-Pertuan Besar of Negeri Sembilan on 5 April 1960, thus ending the need for a regent.

== Later life and succession matters ==
After the conclusion of his regency, Tunku Laksamana Nasir continued to hold his position as one of the Putera Yang Empat, remaining second in the line of succession to the throne of Negeri Sembilan. When Tuanku Munawir ascended to the throne in 1960, the royal hierarchy was reorganized accordingly.

Upon Tuanku Munawir's death in 1967, succession passed not to his young son Tunku Muhriz, who was then only 19 years old, but rather to Tuanku Munawir's younger brother, Tuanku Ja'afar. During Tuanku Ja'afar's subsequent election and reign, Tunku Laksamana Nasir would have continued in his role until his death.

Following Tunku Laksamana Nasir's death in 1977, his position as Tunku Laksamana was eventually succeeded by Tunku Naquiyuddin, the eldest son of Tuanku Ja'afar, who has held the title since 1976 and continues to serve in that capacity.

== Family ==
Tunku Laksamana Nasir had seven sons and three daughters, totaling ten children.

== Death and burial ==
Tunku Laksamana Nasir died in Seri Menanti, Negeri Sembilan, on 22 January 1977, at approximately 76 years of age (his exact birth date remains uncertain). He was interred at the Seri Menanti Royal Mausoleum, the traditional burial place for members of the Negeri Sembilan royal family.

The Seri Menanti Royal Mausoleum is located in the royal town of Seri Menanti, Kuala Pilah District, adjacent to the Tuanku Munawir Royal Mosque. Built in a Mughal architectural style, the mausoleum features a main central dome with smaller domes on the sides and is painted white. It serves as the final resting place for numerous members of the royal family, including Tunku Laksamana Nasir's father, Tuanku Muhammad Shah, his brother, Tuanku Abdul Rahman, and many other distinguished members of the dynasty.

== Legacy ==
=== Educational institutions ===
Both a primary school and a secondary school in Kuala Pilah District bear Tunku Laksamana Nasir's name, serving as lasting tributes to his service to the state. Sekolah Kebangsaan Tunku Laksamana Nasir (SK Tunku Laksamana Nasir) is a primary school located at Jalan Istana Lama Seri Menanti in the town of Seri Menanti.

=== Role in Negeri Sembilan's constitutional development ===
Tunku Laksamana Nasir's service as Regent during the critical period of Malayan independence established an important constitutional precedent for Negeri Sembilan. His regency demonstrated how the state's unique elective monarchy system could accommodate the elevation of its ruler to the federal throne while maintaining constitutional continuity at the state level.

This precedent would prove valuable in subsequent decades, particularly when Tuanku Ja'afar was elected as the tenth Yang di-Pertuan Agong from 1994 to 1999, during which time Tunku Naquiyuddin served as Regent of Negeri Sembilan.

== Historical context ==
=== Negeri Sembilan's unique system ===
Negeri Sembilan's monarchical system is unique within Malaysia and indeed globally. Unlike the hereditary monarchies in Malaysia's other royal states, Negeri Sembilan practices an elective monarchy where the Yang di-Pertuan Besar is chosen by the Undang Yang Empat from among the eligible princes of the royal family. This system has its roots in the Minangkabau customs brought from Sumatra when Raja Melewar became the first ruler of Negeri Sembilan in 1773.

The state's adherence to Adat Perpatih, a matrilineal system of inheritance, further distinguishes it from other Malay states. While property and certain titles pass through the female line, political authority and royal succession remain patrilineal through the descendants of the Pagaruyung dynasty from Sumatra.

=== The 1957 constitutional arrangement ===
The appointment of Tunku Laksamana Nasir as Regent in 1957 was necessitated by the constitutional framework established at Malaysian independence. The Constitution of Malaya created the position of Yang di-Pertuan Agong as a rotating constitutional monarchy, with the nine Malay state rulers taking turns serving five-year terms as the federal head of state.

This innovative system, unique in the world, required careful coordination between federal and state constitutional provisions. When a state ruler ascended to the federal throne, each state developed its own mechanisms for maintaining royal authority. In Negeri Sembilan's case, the appointment of a regent from among the Putera Yang Empat provided an elegant solution that respected both tradition and constitutional necessity.

== See also ==
- Negeri Sembilan
- Tuanku Muhammad Shah
- Abdul Rahman of Negeri Sembilan
- Munawir of Negeri Sembilan
