= Datuk Siamang Gagap =

Malaysian folk hero

- Born: Abdul Kahar bin Mukmin; 1817; Kampung Repah, Tampin, Negeri Sembilan
- Died: Either Juasseh, Negeri Sembilan or Pahang, British Malaya
- Other name: Pendekar Siamang Gagap
- Relatives: Adnan Saidi (great-grandson)

Abdul Kahar bin Mukmin (born 1817 - unknown), who is better known as Datuk Siamang Gagap, was a folk hero from Negeri Sembilan, Malaysia. A hulubalang and a palace official in Seri Menanti during the reign of Yamtuan Antah, he is known for his involvement in the resistance movement against the British in the Battle of Bukit Putus.

== History ==
As a palace official, he was one of the commanders who supported Tunku Antah and the Undangs in the Battle of Bukit Putus, as Tunku Antah fought Tunku Ahmad Tunggal for the succession of the throne, and defended against British intervention.

He later fought against the British late into the 1870s, earning him his reputation as a folk hero.

== Legacy ==
Jalan Dato' Siamang Gagap (formerly Channer Road), a busy road in Seremban, is named in his honour.
