= Seri Menanti Palace =

Palaces in Seri Menanti town, Malaysia

Coordinates: 2°41′54″N 102°09′33″E

There are three palaces in Seri Menanti, the royal capital of Negeri Sembilan, Malaysia: Istana Besar, Istana Lama and Istana Tasik.

== Istana Besar ==
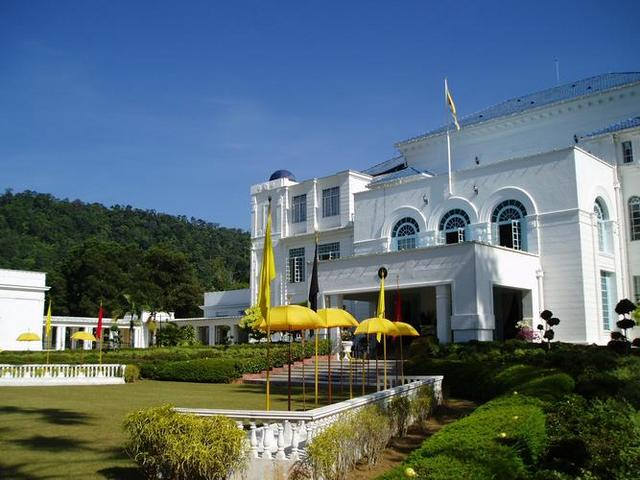
Istana Besar

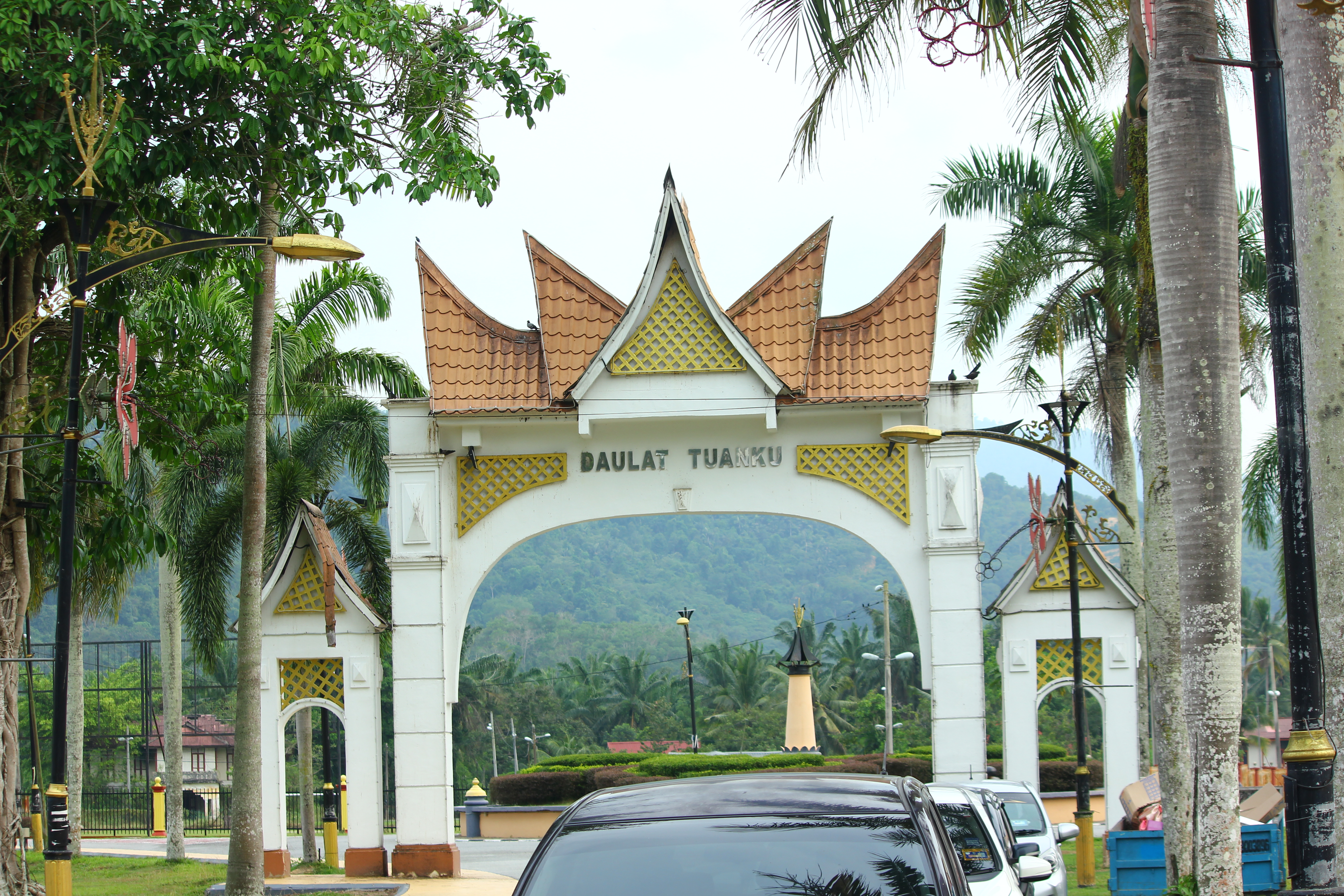
Welcoming arch nearby the palace

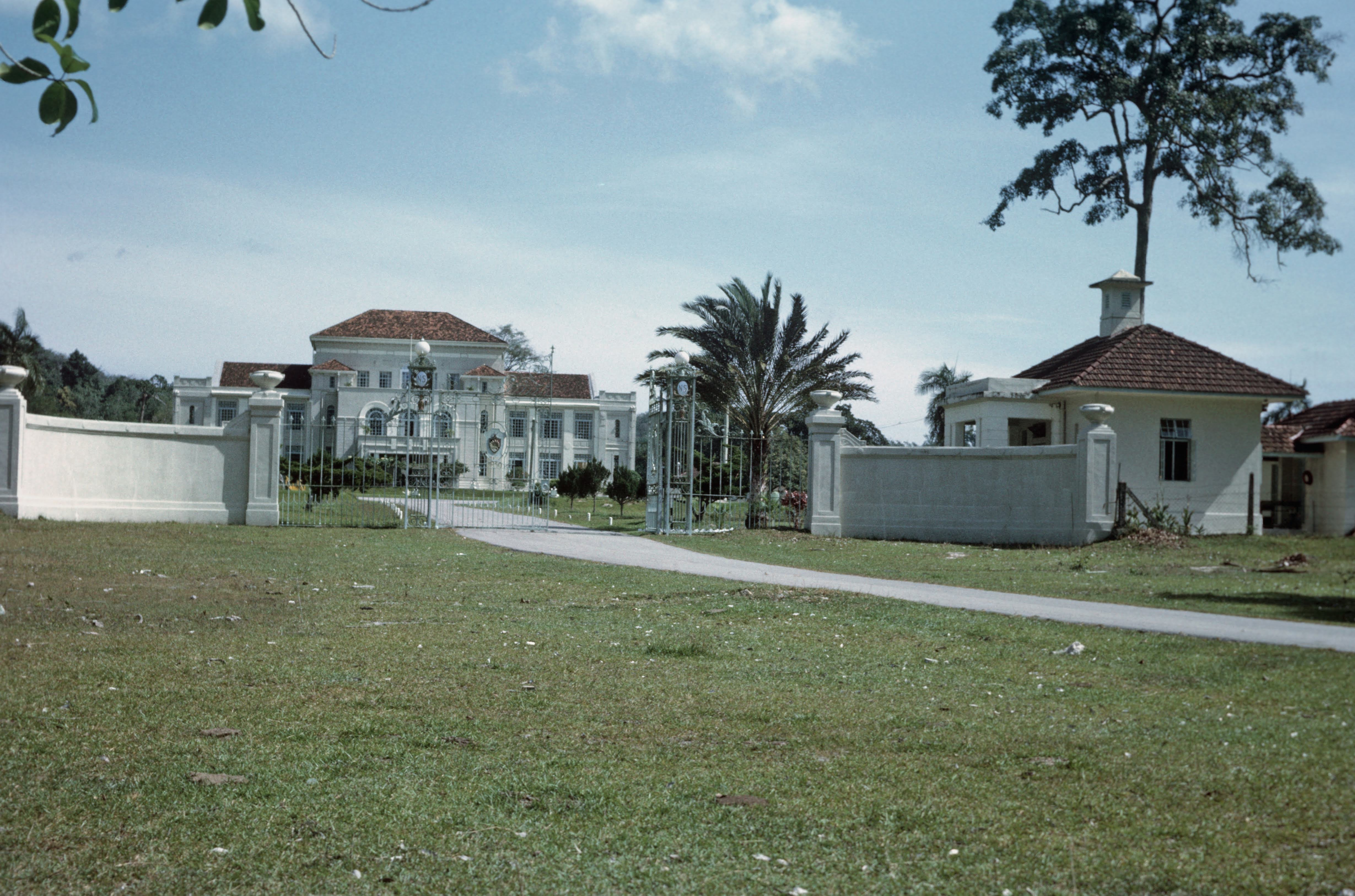
The palace, circa 1964

The Istana Besar (Negeri Sembilan Malay: Istano Bosa, Jawi: ايستان بسر) is the primary palace of the Yang Di-Pertuan Besar of Negeri Sembilan. It was built and completed in 1932, and officiated by Tuanku Muhammad ibni Almarhum Tuanku Antah who moved there after it was completed. The Istana Besar complex has extensive facilities to support the residence of the Yang Di-Pertuan Besar. In the main building, there is a grand hall, waiting and audience rooms, residential apartments spread over three floors. In the adjacent building, there is a throne room (Balairung Seri) where formal ceremonies are held which includes investitures, oath of allegiance / appointment ceremonies and where large congregational prayers are held. The main Banquet Hall, which was constructed almost seventy years later, can house approximately two thousand people. The current Yang Di-Pertuan Besar is Tuanku Muhriz.

There are also offices, facilities and general quarters for palace officials and staff.

== Istana Lama ==
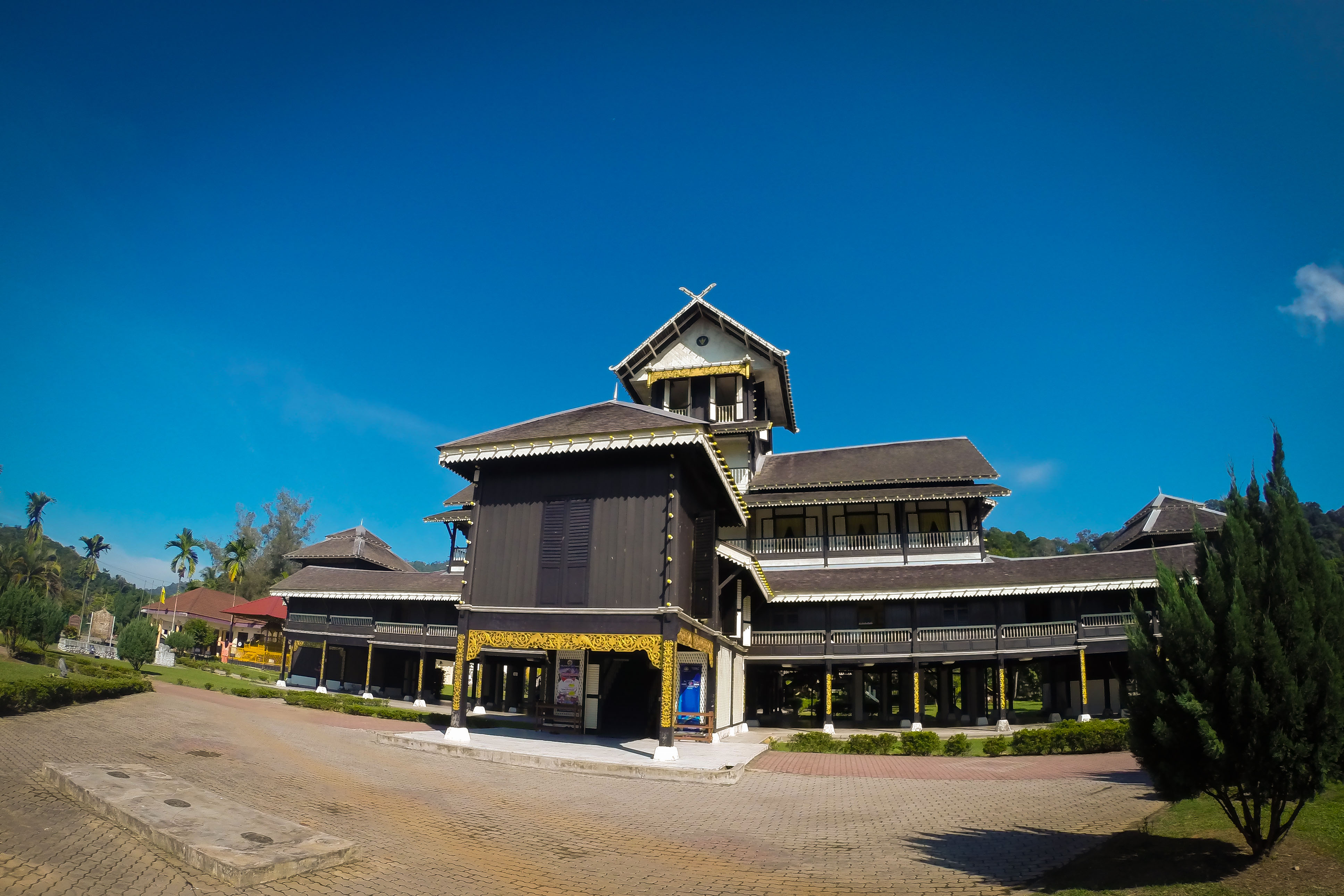
Istana Lama, Seri Menanti

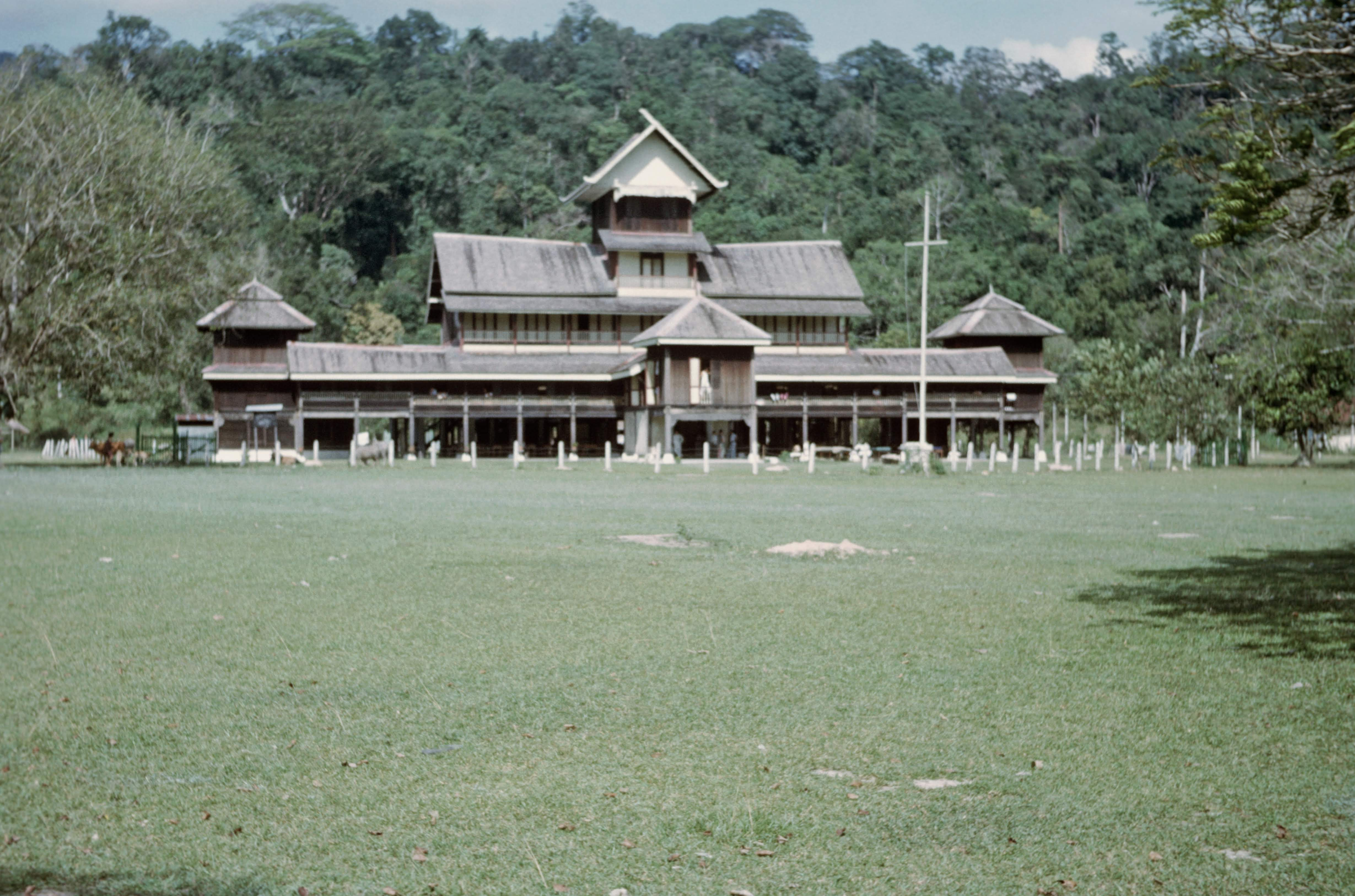
The Istana Lama, 1964

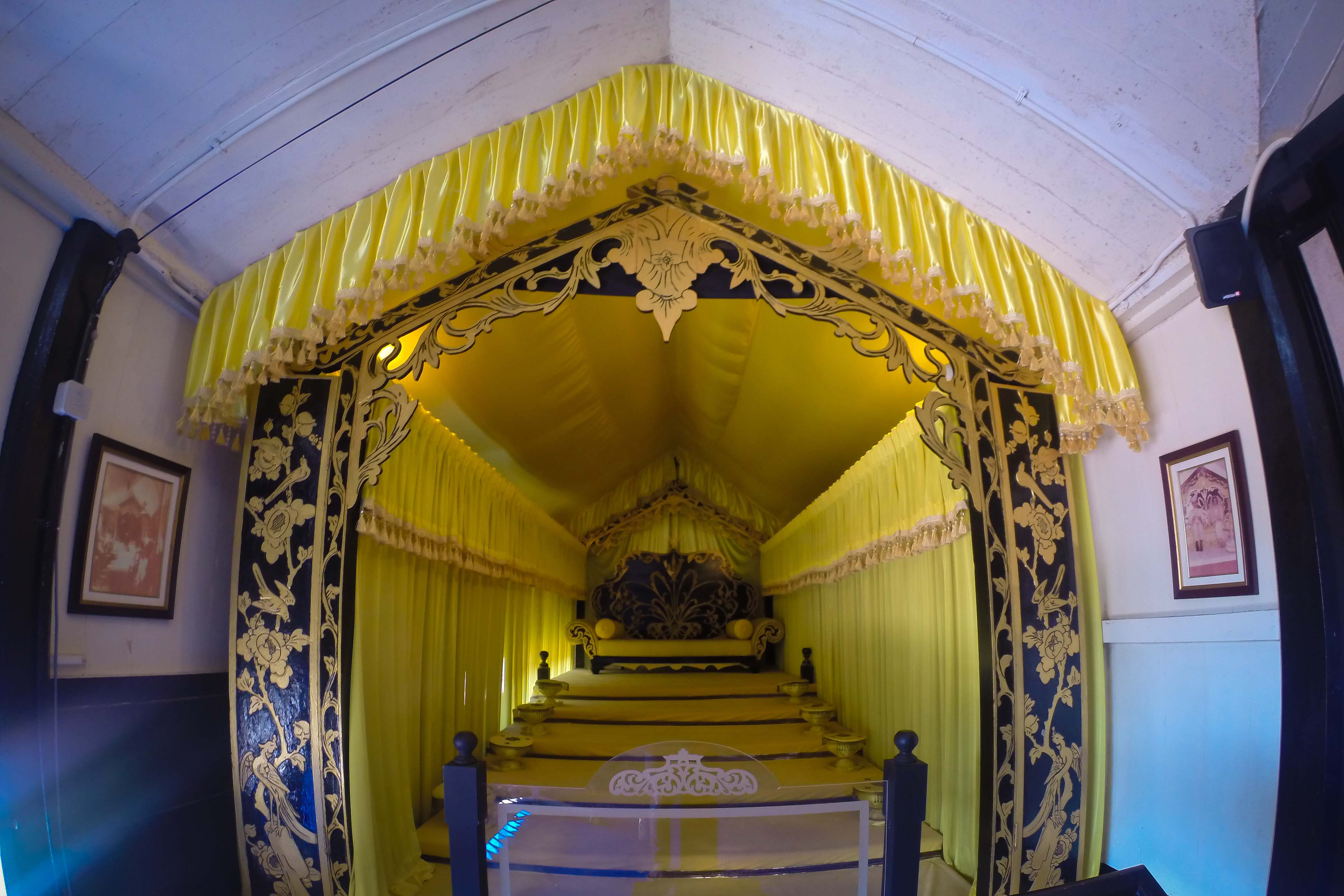
The throne room of the palace

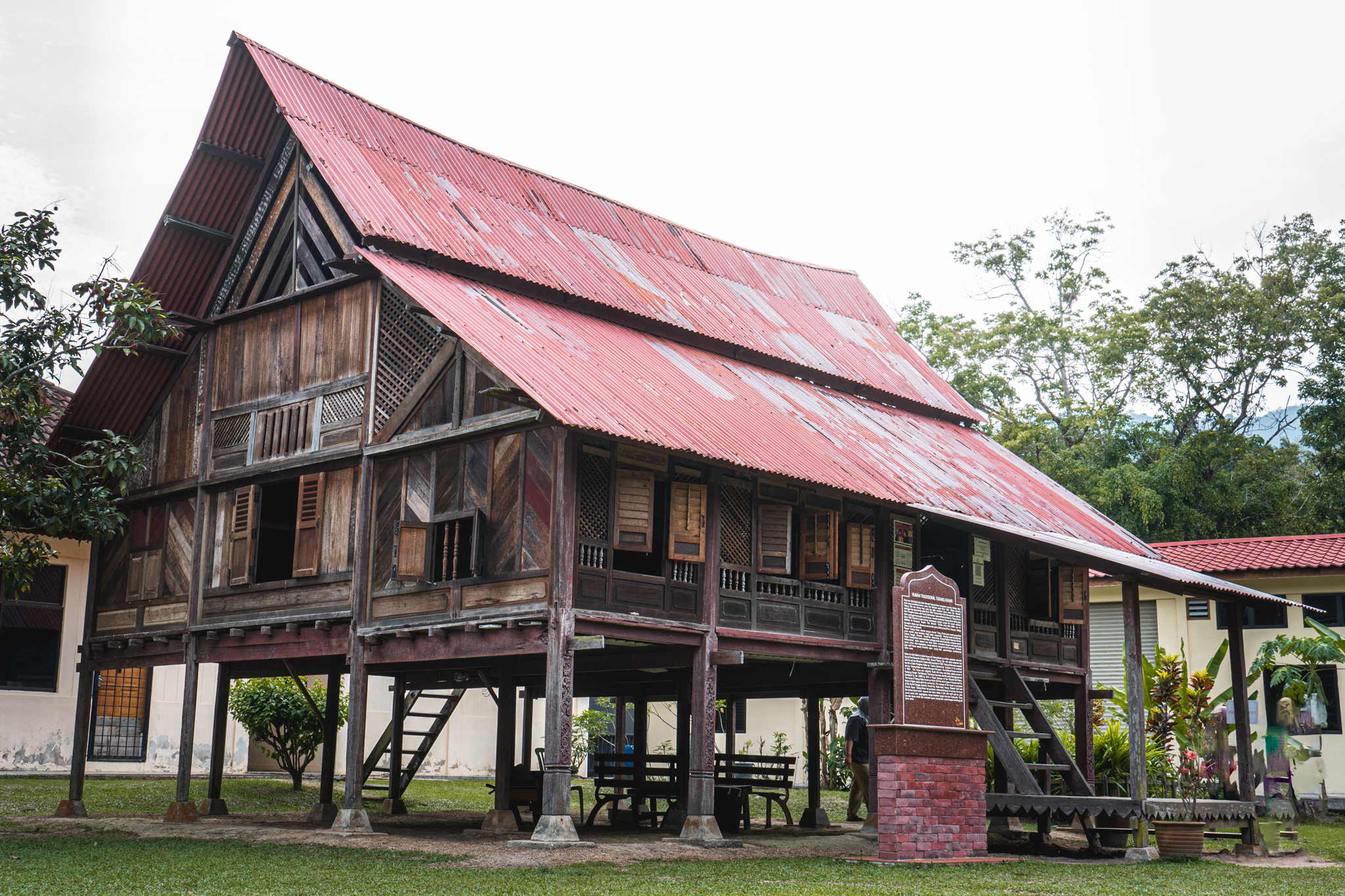
Kahar's residence within the compounds of the Royal Museum

The Istana Lama (Negeri Sembilan Malay: Istano Lamo, Jawi: ايستان لاما) is regarded as the icon of Seri Menanti and one of the famous landmarks in Kuala Pilah District. It is the largest palace in Malaysia that is built entirely out of timber. It is made in part of chengal wood (Neobalanocarpus) and iron wood or belian wood (Eusideroxylon zwageri) and held together using only wooden pegs. The palace took six years to build and was completed in 1908 at a cost of $45,000.00 at that time. The design has subtle hints of Minangkabau architecture, has five levels rising to a height of sixty seven feet or approximately twenty meters high and has ninety nine columns to support the main structure. Four of the main columns of sixty seven feet are the Chengal timber that came from Bukit Pergai, Jelebu and is the central feature of the structure which holds up the apex of the palace, namely the Treasury Room. The Istana Lama was a replacement for Istana Pulih which was burned down by British soldiers. The drawings and plans for Istana Lama was detailed by Mr. Woodford (Public Works Department) based on the designs provided by two local craftsmen, Kahar and Taib. This palace was used until 1932 after which the Yang Di-Pertuan Besar moved to Istana Besar.

The significance of the ninety nine columns is meant to represent the ninety nine officers of the palace (hulubalang), while the four columns at the center is signify the four senior officials of the palace (Orang Empat Istana). The design of Istana Lama was expected to represent the ideals of familyhood, education, heritage and culture, and the historical bond with the Minangkabau kingdom of Pagaruyung.

Istana Lama was used as a religious school between 1959 and 1964, and was unoccupied until 1992. The Istana Lama has been designated as a national heritage site and was converted into a Royal Museum on 14 July 1992, with the consent of and officiated by Tuanku Ja'afar, the Yang di-Pertuan Besar at the time. It is currently closed to the public to facilitate repairs and upgrading works which is expected to be completed in 2020.

The palace has been assigned as building number 115 by the JKR.

== Istana Tasik ==
Istana Tasik or Lake Palace is located at the entrance to Istana Besar on the left, next to a small lake. It is quite small, has basic amenities and is used occasionally when required.

== Heritage ==
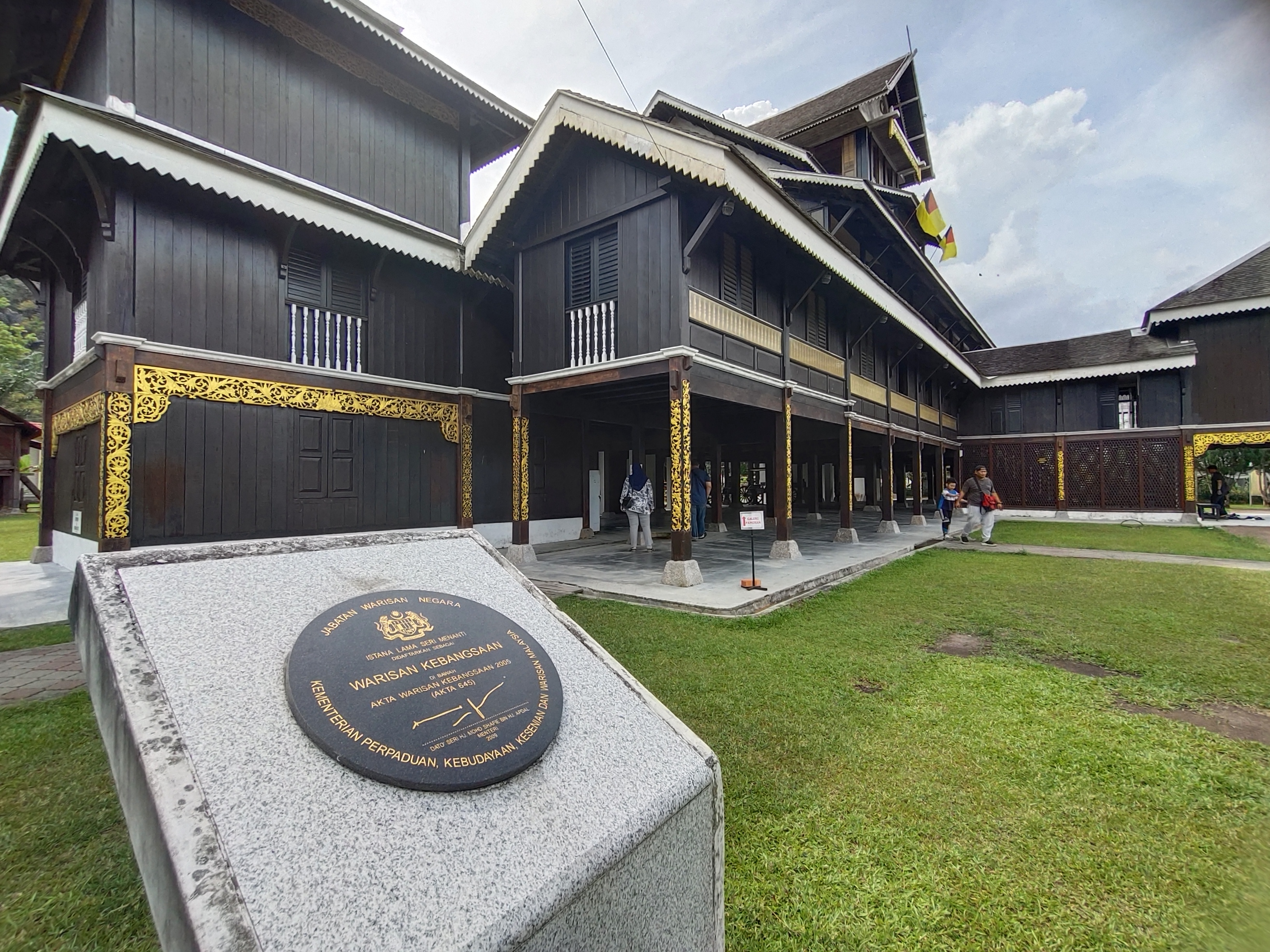
National Heritage plaque on the Istana Lama compounds

In February 2009, the Unity, Culture, Arts and Heritage Minister Datuk Seri Shafie Apdal announced that the Istana Lama is among ten historical structures in Malaysia gazetted as a national heritage, along with Victoria Institution in Kuala Lumpur and The Stadthuys in Malacca.
