= Muhammad of Negeri Sembilan =

Yang di-Pertuan Besar of Negeri Sembilan from 1888 to 1933

Muhammad محمد
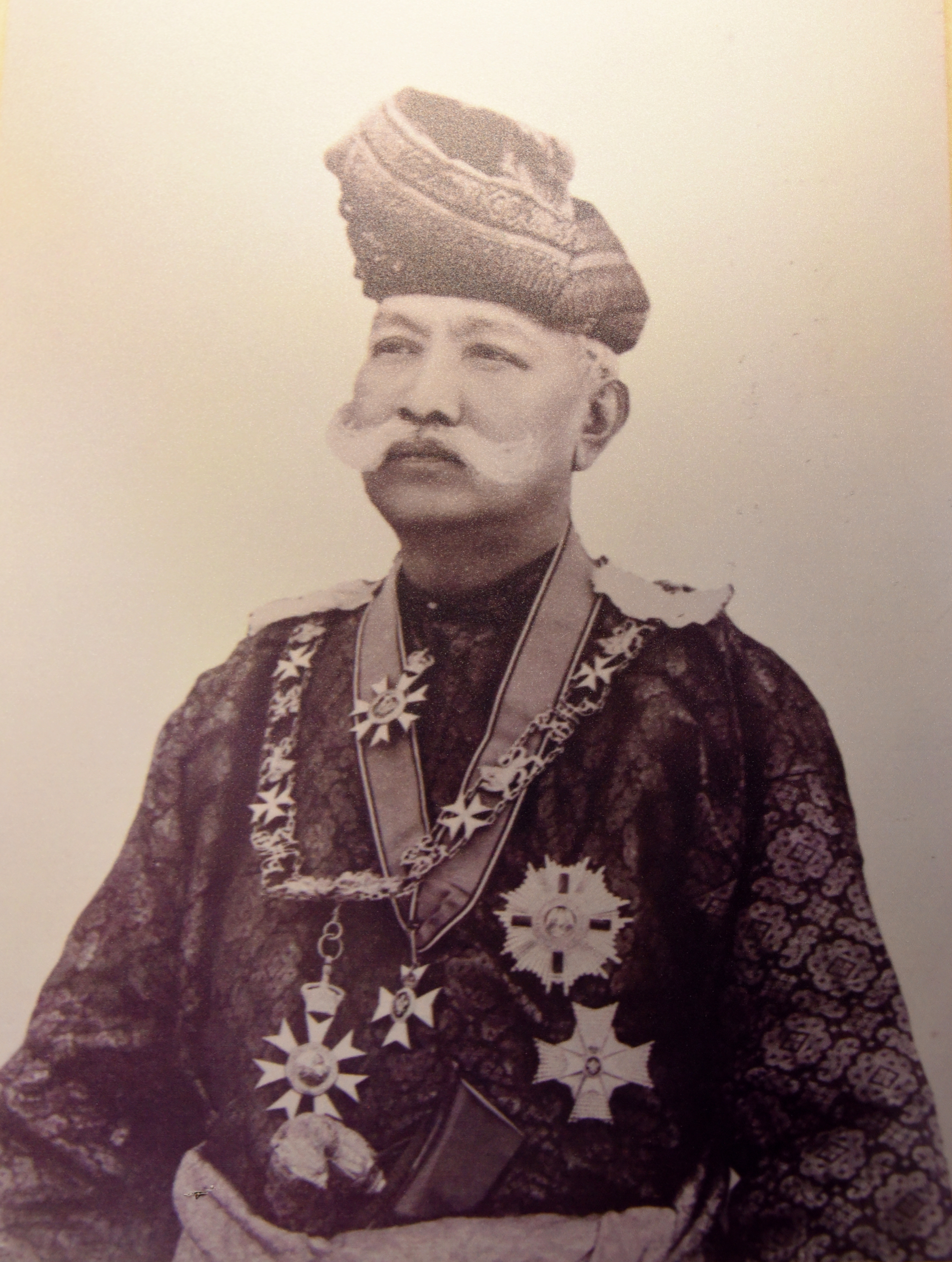
- Muhammad Shah, c. 1870s

Yang di-Pertuan Besar of Negeri Sembilan
- Reign: 29 April 1888 – 1 August 1933
- Installation: 7 May 1888
- Predecessor: Tuanku Antah
- Successor: Tuanku Abdul Rahman
- Born: 25 April 1865; Seri Menanti, Negeri Sembilan, British Malaya
- Died: 1 August 1933 (aged 68); Seri Menanti, Negeri Sembilan, Federated Malay States, British Malaya
- Burial: Seri Menanti Royal Mausoleum, Seri Menanti, Negeri Sembilan, Malaysia
- Issue: Tunku Abdul Aziz; Tunku Abdul Rahman; Tunku Laksamana Nasir Alam Shah; Tunku Muhammad Alam Shah
Names
- Tunku Muhammad ibni Tunku Antah (at birth)
- Dynasty: Pagaruyung – House of Yamtuan Raden
- Father: Yamtuan Antah ibni Almarhum Yamtuan Radin
- Mother: Cik Halima binti Uggoh
- Religion: Sunni Islam

Tuanku Muhammad ibni Almarhum Yamtuan Antah (Jawi: توانكو سر محمد شاه ابن المرحوم توانكو انته; 25 April 1865 – 1 August 1933) was the seventh Yamtuan Besar of Seri Menanti, and ruled from 1888 to 1933. During his reign, Negeri Sembilan came under British protection in 1889 and became a Federated Malay State in 1895.

In June 1887, he was declared as Yamtuan as recognised by British authority. Tuanku Muhammad re-established the traditional constitution with the four Undangs (Lawgivers) and, on 29 April 1898, he was duly elected by the four Undangs as Yang di-Pertuan Besar; the first election under the modern re-constituted Negeri Sembilan. He was installed on 7 May 1898 at Seri Menanti.

He died in 1933 at the age of 68, having reigned for 45 years. He was buried at the Seri Menanti Royal Mausoleum.

He is regarded as the father of Negeri Sembilan's modernisation. After his death, an English school in Kuala Pilah, Sekolah Menengah Kebangsaan Tuanku Muhammad was renamed after him in his honour. This school is the second oldest school in Negeri Sembilan, along with its twin in Johor, Maktab Sultan Abu Bakar and High School Batu Pahat were found in 1914 respectively.

Tuanku Muhammad was the first Yamtuan Besar to have received the title 'Sir' from Queen Victoria. He was also the longest-serving monarch of Negeri Sembilan in the state's history. He had also been involved in the Durbar (Conference of Rulers) of Federated Malay States, with Sultan Idris of Perak, Sultan Abdul Samad of Selangor and Sultan Ahmad of Pahang. He is one of the Kings who founded the nation's first residential college, The Malay College in Kuala Kangsar. His son and grandson, Abdul Rahman of Negeri Sembilan and Tuanku Ja'afar would go on to study there as teenagers, who eventually become the first and tenth Yang di-Pertuan Agong respectively.

Tuanku Muhammad oversaw the building of both the Istana Lama (now the Royal Museum of Seri Menanti), and the Istana Besar.

== Death ==
Tuanku Muhammad died on 1 August 1933, shortly before 3pm at the Istana Lama. Shortly after his death, his brother the Tunku Besar Burhanuddin summoned the Penghulus of Luak Tanah Mengandung (the area around Seri Menanti), comprising the Datos of Ulu Muar, Jempol, Terachi and Gunung Pasir. This was then followed by a 22-gun salute.

The four principal Lembagas of Ulu Muar then conveyed the news of his death to the four Undangs.

His body was left to lay in state the day after his death. He was buried on the third day after his death following the proclamation of his successor. The coffin was transported from the Istana on a specially-adapted lorry drawn by the Pegawai Sembilan-puluh sembilan, accompanied by the Orang Ampat Astana and the Ulama. The traditional Maharaja di-raja ceremonial carriage led the procession, carrying the Treasurer and dispensers of Sadaqah. The procession by the mourners was, in order: the newly-proclaimed Yang di-Pertuan Besar, Tuanku Abdul Rahman; senior members of the royal family; the anak putra putri with the chiefs and representatives of other Rulers and of high government officials; other mourners; and the late-King's subjects. A 68-gun salute, corresponding to Tuanku Muhammad's life was fired.

Tuanku Muhammad was succeeded by his eldest and the then-Tunku Muda Serting, Tunku Abdul Rahman as the eighth Yang di-Pertuan Besar, having been unanimously chosen by the four Undangs.

== Honours ==
- United Kingdom
  - Honorary Knight Grand Cross of the Order of St Michael and St George (GCMG) (1 January 1931)
  - Honorary Knight Commander of the Order of St Michael and St George (KCMG) (3 June 1916)
  - Honorary Companion of the Order of St Michael and St George (CMG) (1 January 1894)
  - Knight Commander of the Royal Victorian Order (KCVO) (10 July 1925)

== Gallery ==
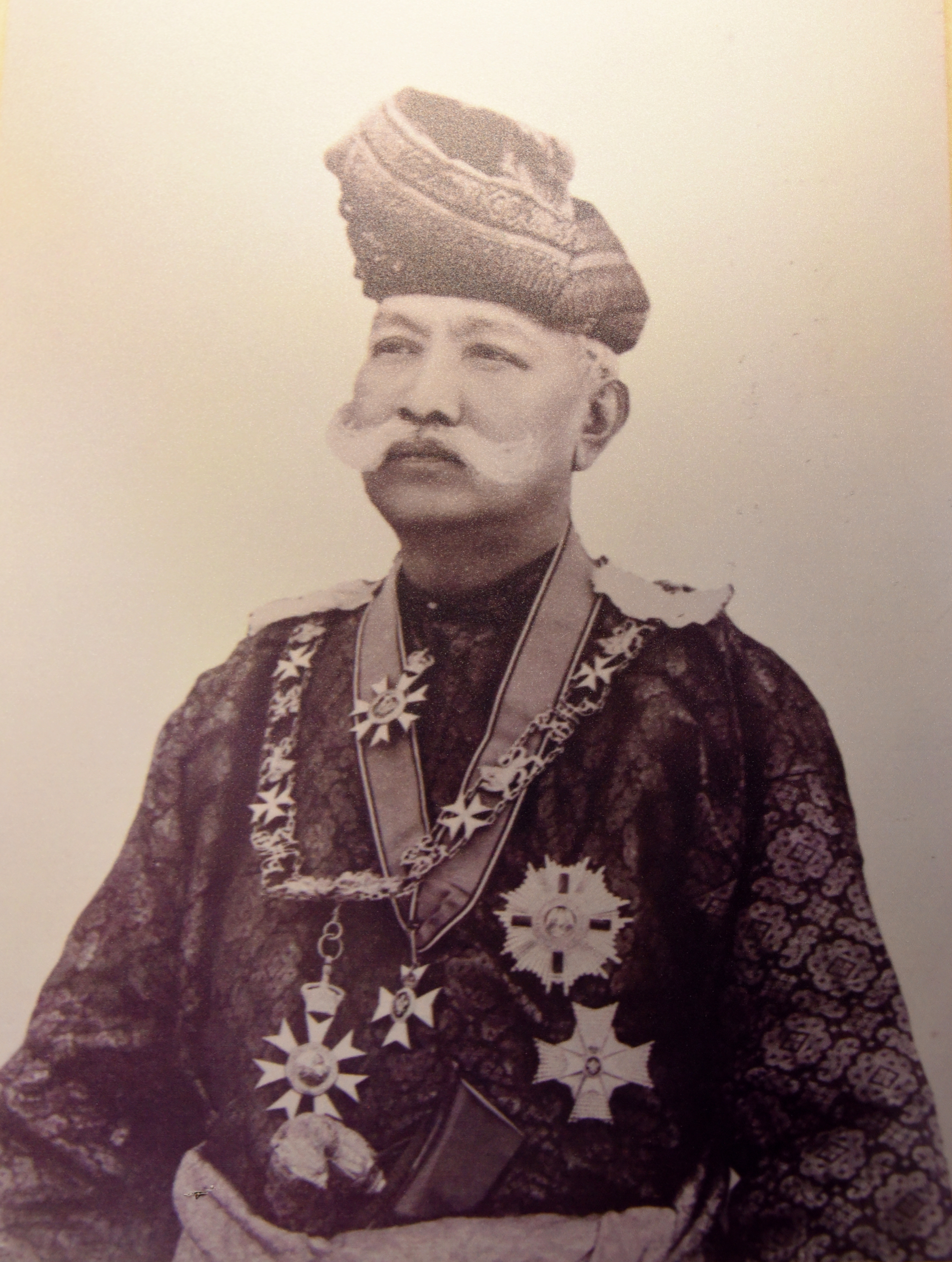
Tuanku Muhammad Shah. The Tuanku Ja'afar Royal Gallery, Seremban

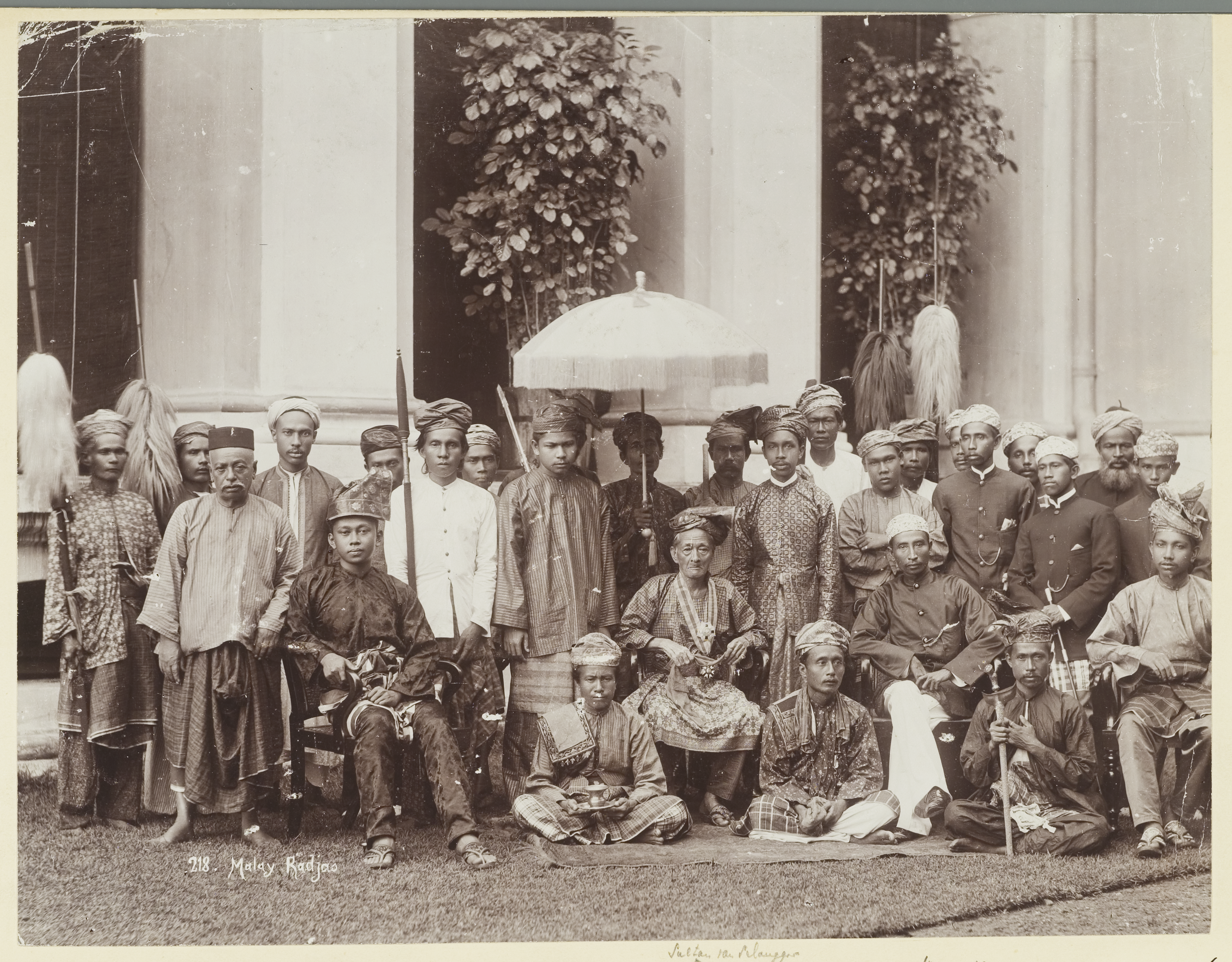
Government House, Singapore on 27 Mar 1890: Yam Tuan Muhammad of Negeri Sembilan seated far right

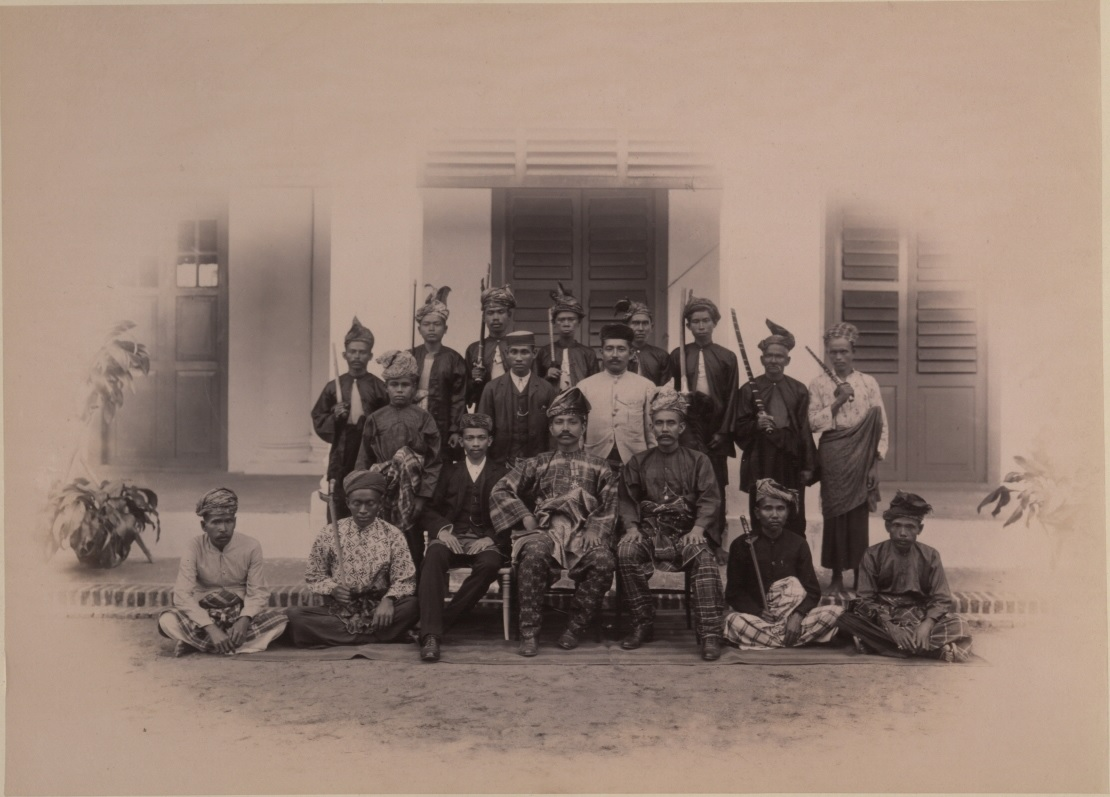
Tuanku Muhammad Shah, 1897, seated centre

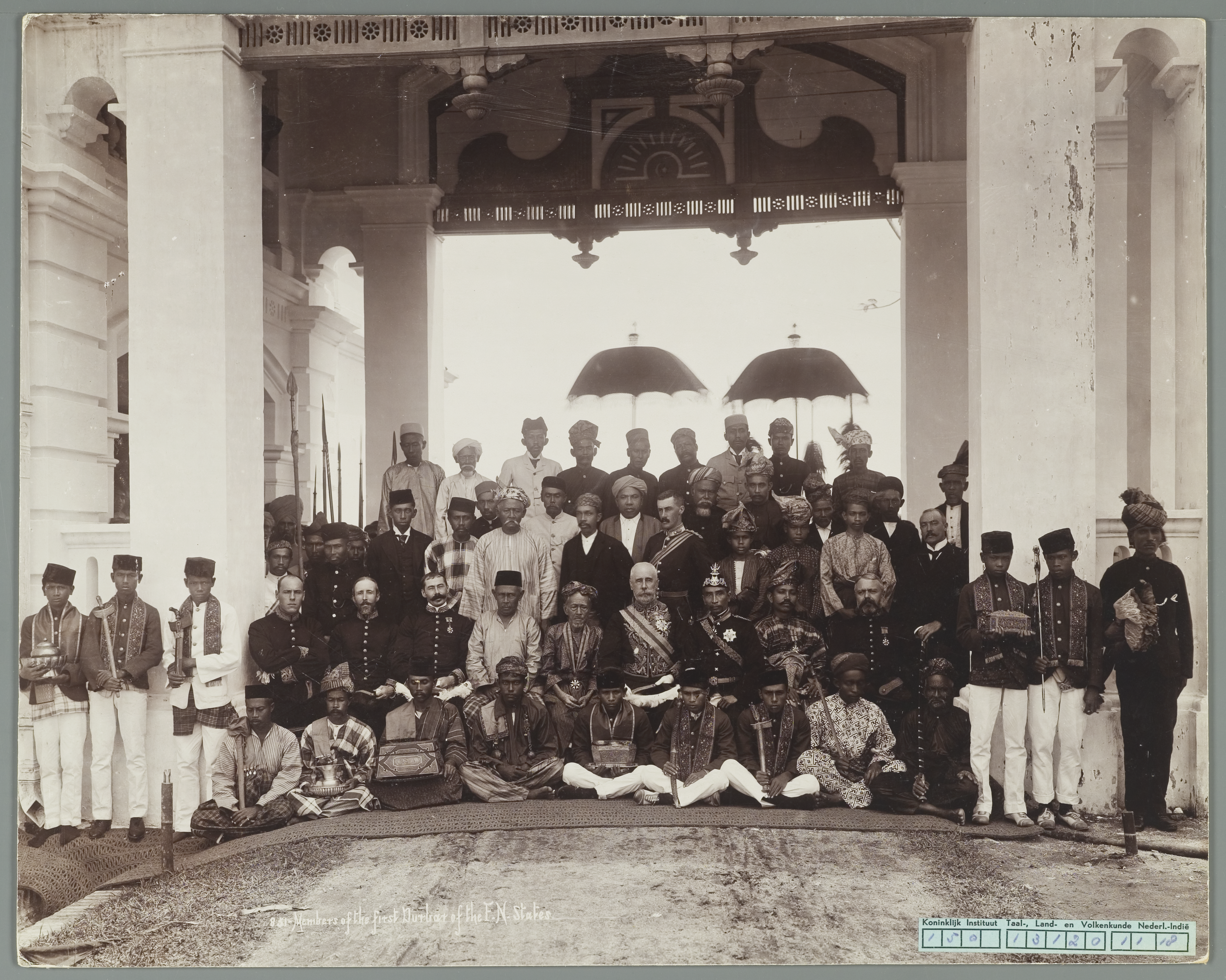
1st Malayan Durbar (Federal Conference) 14 July 1897 in Kuala Kangsar; YamTuan Muhammad Shah seated second from right

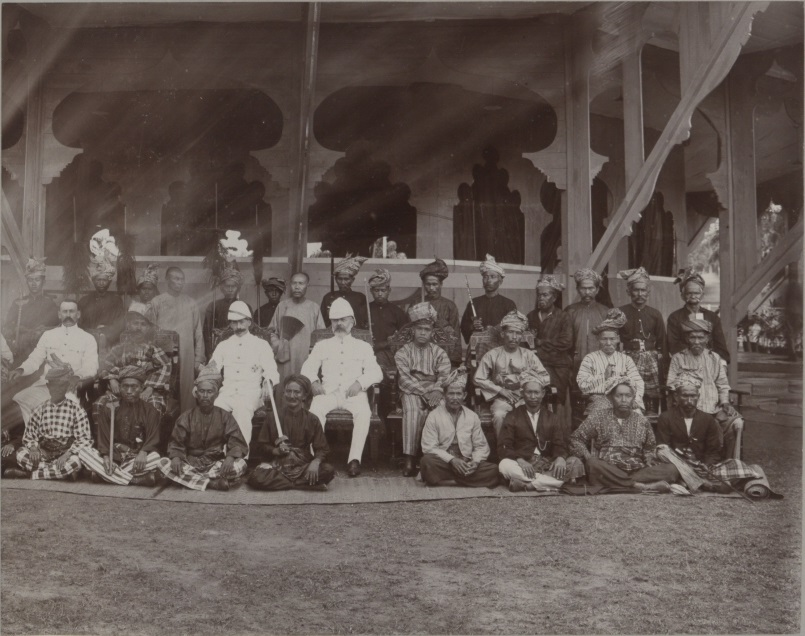
H.H. The Yam Tuan of Negri Sembilan and other chiefs, 1903.
