= Antah of Negeri Sembilan =

Yamtuan Besar of Negeri Sembilan / Yang Di Pertuan Seri Menanti from 1869 to 1888

Antah انته
- Yamtuan Besar of Negeri Sembilan / Yang Di Pertuan Seri Menanti
- Reign: 1874–1888
- Predecessor: Tengku Ampuan Intan (acting Yamtuan Besar)
- Successor: Tuanku Muhammad
- Born: Tunku Antah ibni Tunku Nasiruddin; 1812; Negeri Sembilan
- Died: October 22, 1888 (aged 75–76); Seri Menanti, Negeri Sembilan
- Spouse: Cik Puan Besar Halima binti Uggoh, Cik Puan Wan Siti binti Haji Doraman, Cik Puan Halija, Cik Puan Yang
- Issue: Tuanku Muhammad; Tunku Besar Burhanuddin; Tunku Laksamana Abdul Kahar; Tunku Sulaiman; Tunku Fatimah; Tunku Aisha; Tunku Rafia
Names
- Tuanku Antah ibni Tuanku Nasiruddin
- Dynasty: Pagaruyung - House of Yamtuan Radin
- Father: Tuanku Nasiruddin (Yamtuan Radin)
- Mother: Tunku Ampuan Intan
- Religion: Sunni Islam
- Military Service
- Conflicts: Sungai Ujong War; Battle of Paroi; Battle of Bukit Putus

Tuanku Antah ibni Almarhum Yamtuan Radin (Jawi: توانكو انته ابن المرحوم يمتوان رادين; 1812 – 22 October 1888) was the sixth Yamtuan Besar of Negeri Sembilan. He ruled from 1874 to 1888 and was known for trying to keep Negeri Sembilan free from British intervention. His son Tuanku Muhammad Shah succeeded him and modernised the state.

== Early life ==
Tuanku Antah was the son of Yamtuan Radin, the Yang di-Pertuan Besar of Negeri Sembilan from 1824 to 1861, and his consort, Tuanku Ampuan Intan Tunku Alang Husain.

One of his wives was Cik Puan Wan Siti binti Haji Doraman. They lived at the Kampung Tanjung Jati, Kuala Pilah. They had two sons Tunku Putra Sulaiman Ibni Tuanku Antah and Tunku Laksamana Abdul Kahar Tuanku Antah.

== History ==
=== Sungai Ujong ===
His struggle against the British began in March 1872 when Datuk Kelana Syed Abdul Rahman, who governed Sungai Ujong (modern-day Seremban) allowed the British to open a tin mine and set up their operations within his domain. With the help of British soldiers, he defeated his enemy Datuk Bandar Tunggal and burned Rahang.

As the appointment of a foreigner, Resident Captain Patrick J. Murray, into Datuk Kelana's court was seen by other local officials as a telltale sign of a British invasion, the officials crowned Tunku Antah as the Yamtuan of Seri Menanti, who did not recognise Datuk Kelana's authority.

Datuk Kelana claimed Terachi as part of his territory in 1875, which led to Tuanku Antah's ire. He dismissed the local government there that supported Datuk Kelana. Resident Murray interpreted this as a breach against Datuk Kelana's administration, so he went to Terachi with 20 soldiers led by Lieutenant Hinxman, and Dominic Daly, an interpreter and doctor from Australia, to investigate, but they did not find any sign of disorder there. Murray returned to Sungai Ujong, but Daly travelled from Terachi to Kuala Pilah to measure their distances. Daly was turned away when his party stumbled unto 200 men who threatened them to leave, and requested Murray to help him.

=== Battle of Bukit Putus ===
Tuanku Antah mobilised 4,000 soldiers in preparation for the oncoming British invasion, and was helped by several others: Datuk Siamang Gagap, the Tunku Besar of Tampin, and the people of Rembau, Jelebu, and Johol. His army marched into Bukit Putus and Paroi, where he warned Murray not to interfere with his sovereignty by trespassing into Terachi. The British Resident then requested help from the Straits Settlements, who sent 20 soldiers led by Lieutenant Peyton from Malacca, while Hinxman and his troops immediately dug trenches and fortified their compound, due to uprisings. Hinxman also brought another army with him, consisting of 30 troops, 30 policemen, and six Arabs, to attack Tuanku Antah at Paroi, but they were outnumbered by the locals, who surrounded and defeated them, while Tuanku Antah's forces occupied a house along the banks of the Linggi River as their base of operations.

On 5 December 1875, the British used Datuk Kelana's cannons to fight against Tuanku Antah. After an hour-long shootout, Hinxman and Peyton advanced through a swamp to destroy Tuanku Antah's fort, but they were not able to find him, and Tunku Laksamana took his place to govern Seri Menanti.

Reinforced by 350 soldiers led by Governor Anson from Penang, the British bombarded Tuanku Antah's fortress. Tuanku Antah was forced to retreat, and the British retook Paroi. With the arrival of the battleship HMS Thistle to Sungai Ujong, still more reinforcements arrived under Lieutenant Colonel Clay, who led his group of 280 soldiers to retake Bukit Sungai Ujong. He later led his troops through Langkap into Bukit Putus, where his forces defeated more of Tuanku Antah's soldiers, and advanced on to Seri Menanti. Notified of the British approaching to his capital, Tuanku Antah fled with his family to Johor, where they came under the protection of Sultan Abu Bakar.

Sultan Abu Bakar then advised him to make peace with the British. In May 1876, Tuanku Antah arranged a meeting with the four Undangs of Negeri Sembilan between them and William Jervois, the Governor of Singapore. Under a peace treaty between all the belligerents, the British agreed to allow Tuanku Antah to rule Seri Menanti, Johol, Ulu Muar, Jempol, Terachi, Gunung Pasir, and Ineh, and renamed his title Yang di-Pertuan Seri Menanti while the other regions of Negeri Sembilan would continue to be ruled by their respective leaders, and Sungai Ujong remained under British rule.

== Death ==
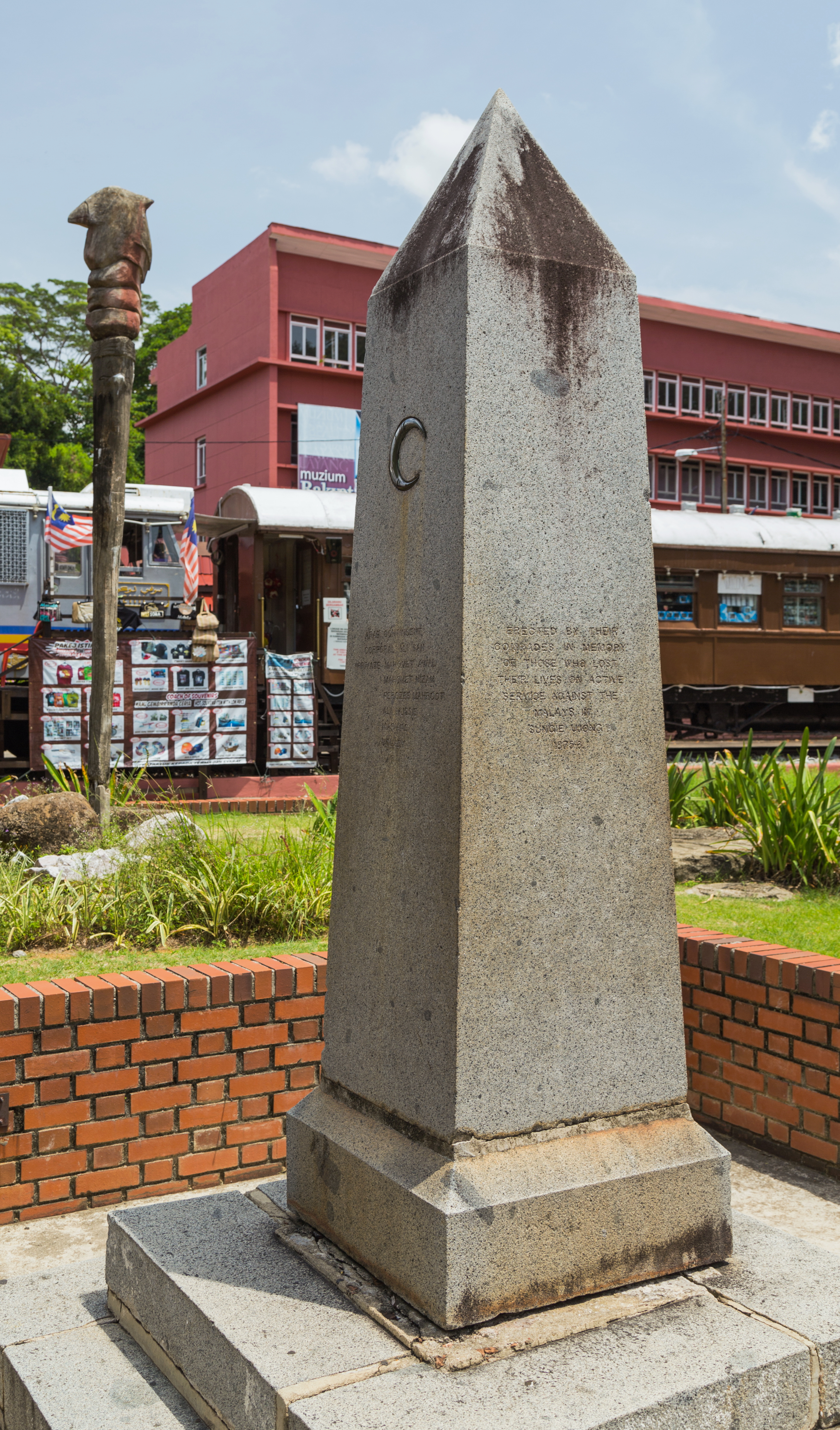
After two years in Johor, Tuanku Antah returned to Seri Menanti, where he lived for eleven years. He died in October, 22 1888, at age 76 and was interred at the Seri Menanti Royal Mausoleum. His grandson, Tuanku Abdul Rahman ibni Tuanku Muhammad later became the first Yang di-Pertuan Agong of Malaysia.

Regnal titles
Preceded by Tengku Ampuan Intan (acting Yamtuan Besar)	Yamtuan Besar; Yamtuan Besar of Negeri Sembilan; 1869–1888	Succeeded by Tuanku Muhammad
