= Seri Menanti =

Seri Menanti Soghi Monanti (Negeri Sembilan Malay)
- Royal capital
- The Royal Town of Seri Menanti; Bandar Diraja Seri Menanti
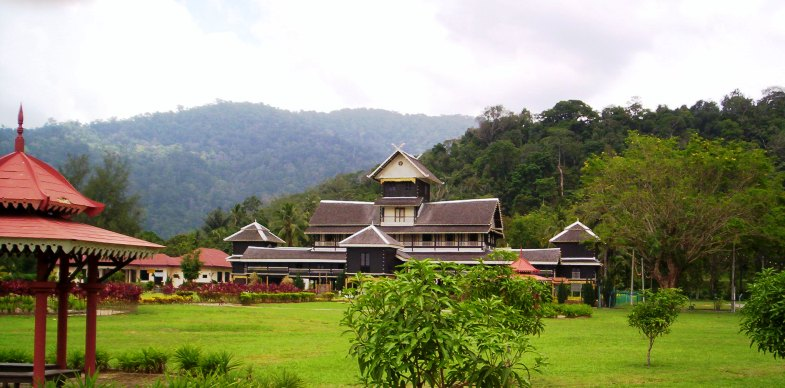
- The iconic Royal Museum
- Location of Seri Menanti in Negeri Sembilan
- Location of Seri Menanti in Peninsular Malaysia
- Coordinates: 2°41′51″N 102°09′30″E
- Country: Malaysia
- State: Negeri Sembilan
- District: Kuala Pilah
- Luak: Adat Lingkungan (main); Gunung Pasir, Jempol, Terachi, Ineh, Ulu Muar (administratively)
- Founded: circa 17th century
- As royal capital: 1773

Government
  - Body: Kuala Pilah District Council
  - President: Nawal Mohamed Amin
  - MP: Adnan Abu Hassan (BN–UMNO)
  - MLA: Muhammad Sufian Maradzi (BN–UMNO)
- Elevation: 115 m (377 ft)

Population
  - Total: 1,610
- Time zone: UTC+8 (MST)
- Postcode: 71550

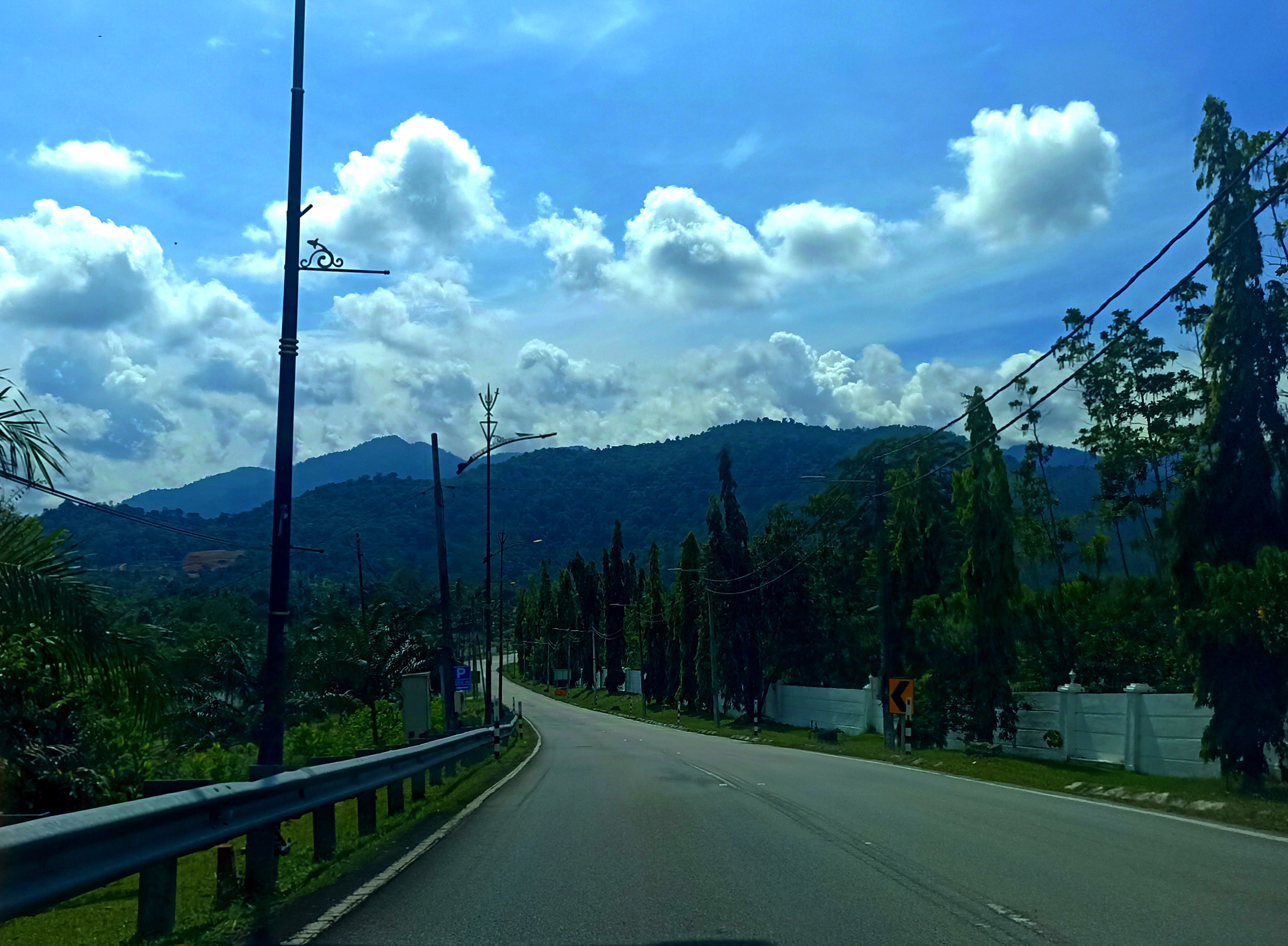
The Titiwangsa Mountains dominate much of Seri Menanti's landscape.

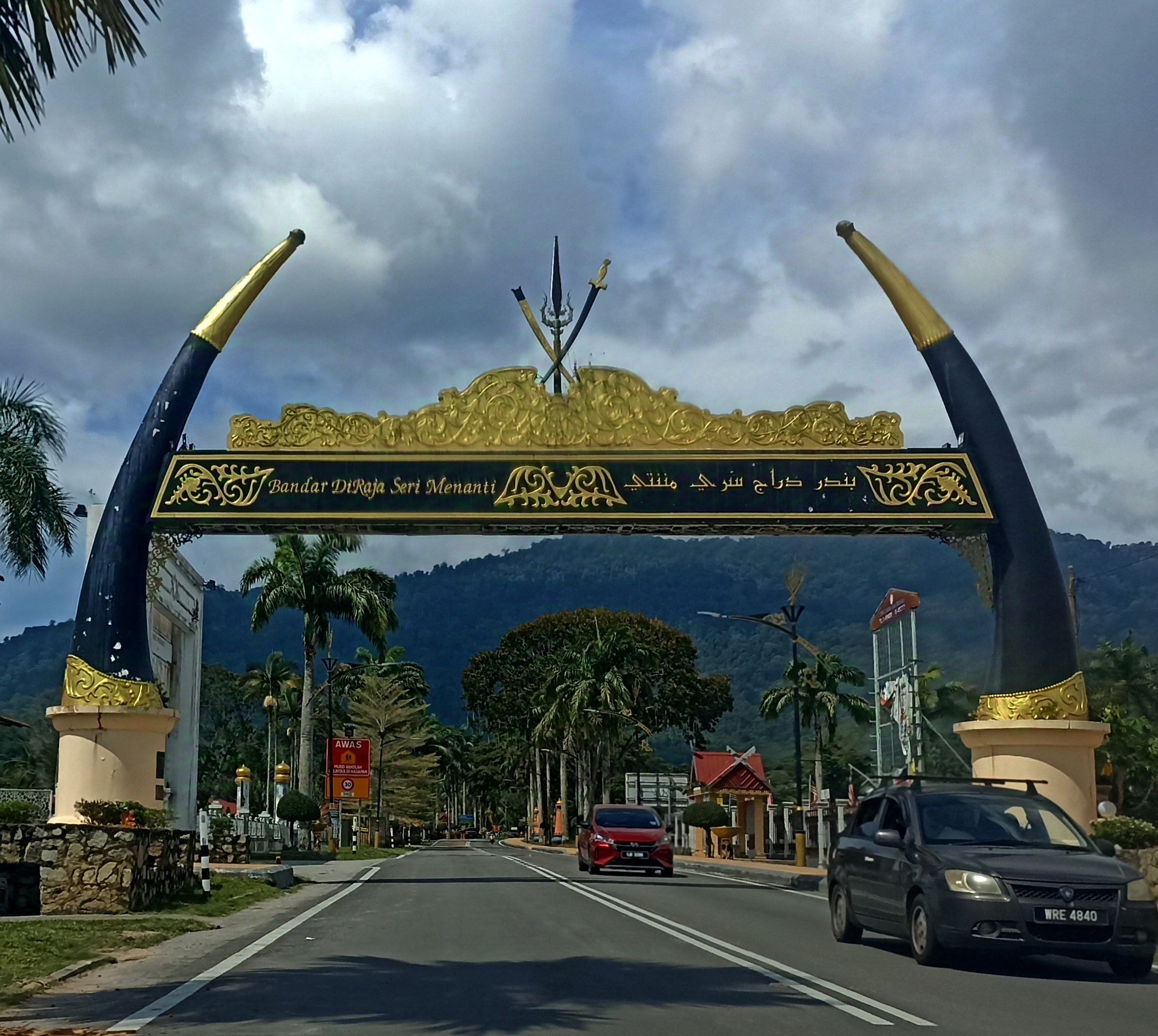
Welcoming arch

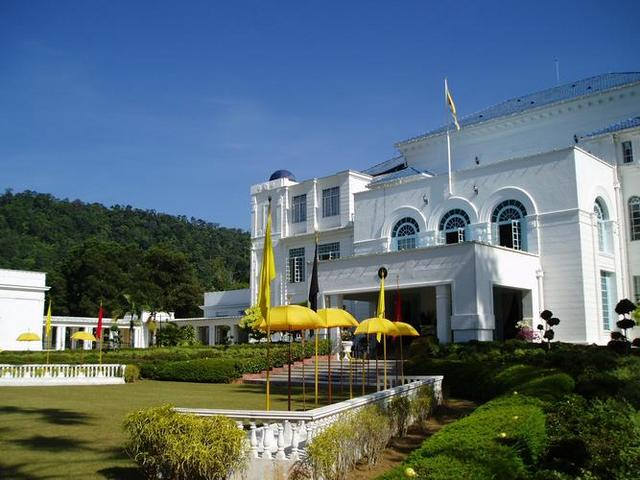
The current residence of the Yang Di-Pertuan Besar of Negeri Sembilan, the Istana Besar

Seri Menanti in Kuala Pilah District

Seri Menanti (Negeri Sembilan Malay: Soghi Monanti or Sinanti) is a town, a mukim, and a state assembly constituency in Kuala Pilah District, central Negeri Sembilan, Malaysia, located 33 km (20.5 m) east of the state capital city of Seremban and 14 km (8.7 m) southwest of Kuala Pilah. It is the royal capital of the state of Negeri Sembilan and houses the seat of the ruler of the state of Negeri Sembilan, referred to as the Yang Di-Pertuan Besar of Negeri Sembilan or Yamtuan Besar. The royal palace is known as Istana Besar (Grand Palace).

Seri Menanti is situated in a valley surrounded by the verdant rolling hills of the Negri Titiwangsa. The area in which Seri Menanti is located is known as the Adat Circle (Malay: Adat Lingkungan). Seri Menanti also governs the surrounding chiefdoms (known locally as luak) of Terachi, Gunung Pasir, Ulu Muar, Jempol, and Ineh, collectively known as Luak Tanah Mengandung.

== History ==
The Minangkabau people migrated to the wider area of Negeri Sembilan during the 14th century as part of the Minang practice of merantau. Around the 17th century, the Minangkabau moved further inland from Rembau to the area that is modern-day Seri Menanti. Among the explorers were Datuk Puteh of Pagar Ruyung. According to legend, the explorers found three stalks of fresh green paddy and thus Datuk Puteh christened the area Padi Menanti (literally "awaiting paddy"). Over time, the name changed to Seri Menanti. It is believed that the word "seri" corresponds to the Goddess of rice in the ancient Javanese tradition (Javanese: Sri).

Raja Melewar arrived in Negeri Sembilan in 1773 and was proclaimed the first Yamtuan Besar in Kampung Penajis in Rembau. He later moved his palace to Seri Menanti, which remains to this day the royal capital of Negeri Sembilan.

== Notable and historical landmarks ==
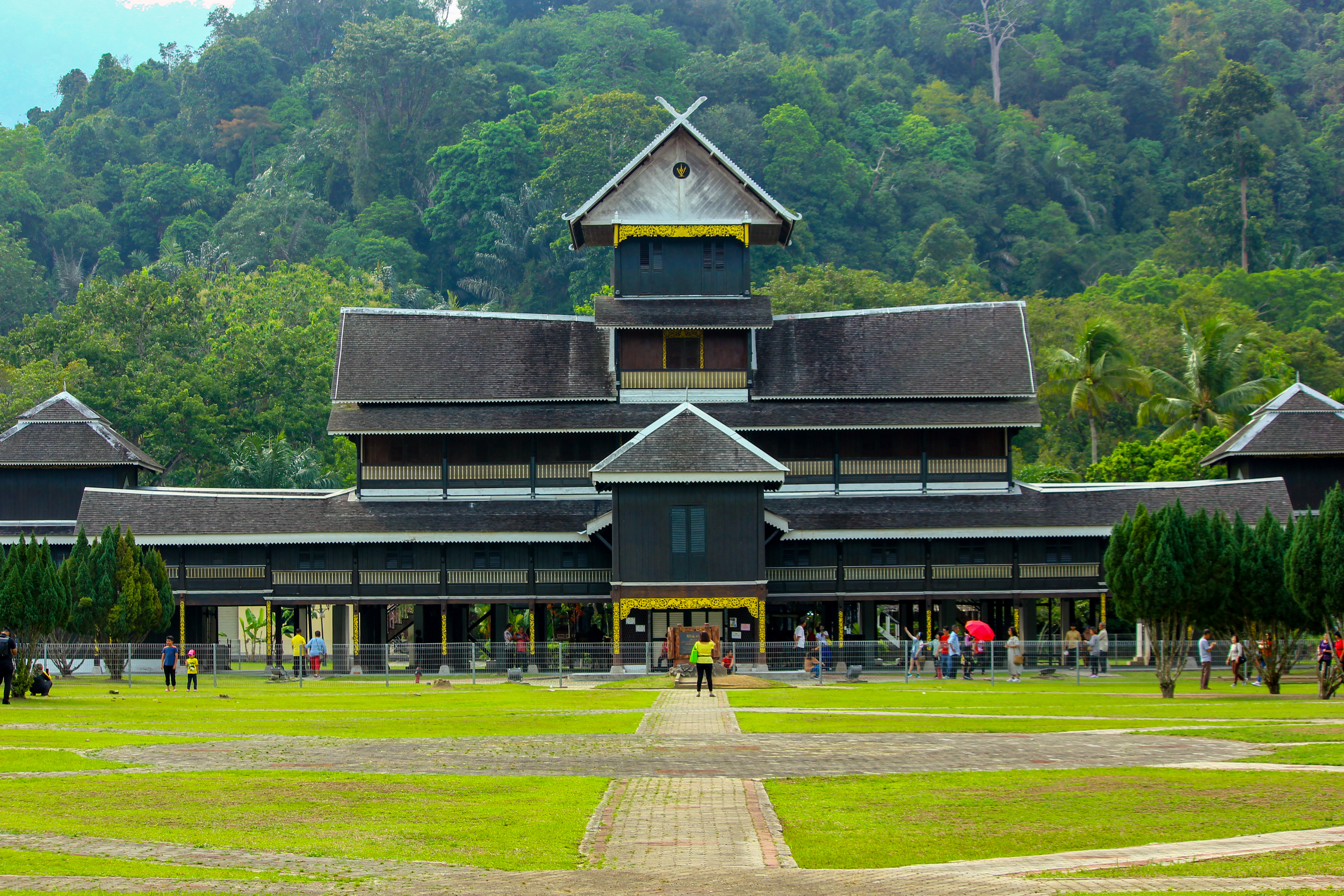
Istana Lama, now the Royal Museum.

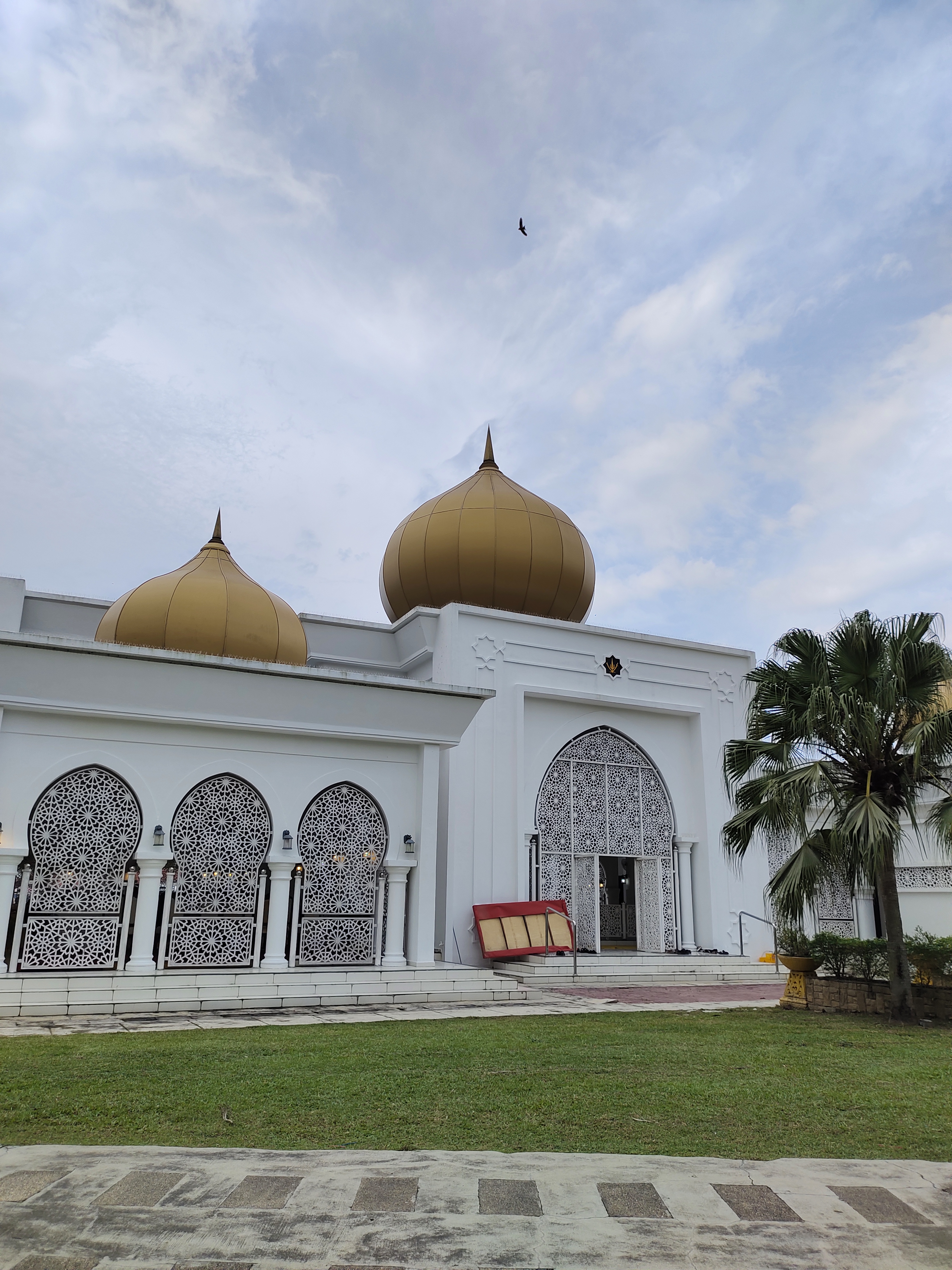
Royal Mausoleum

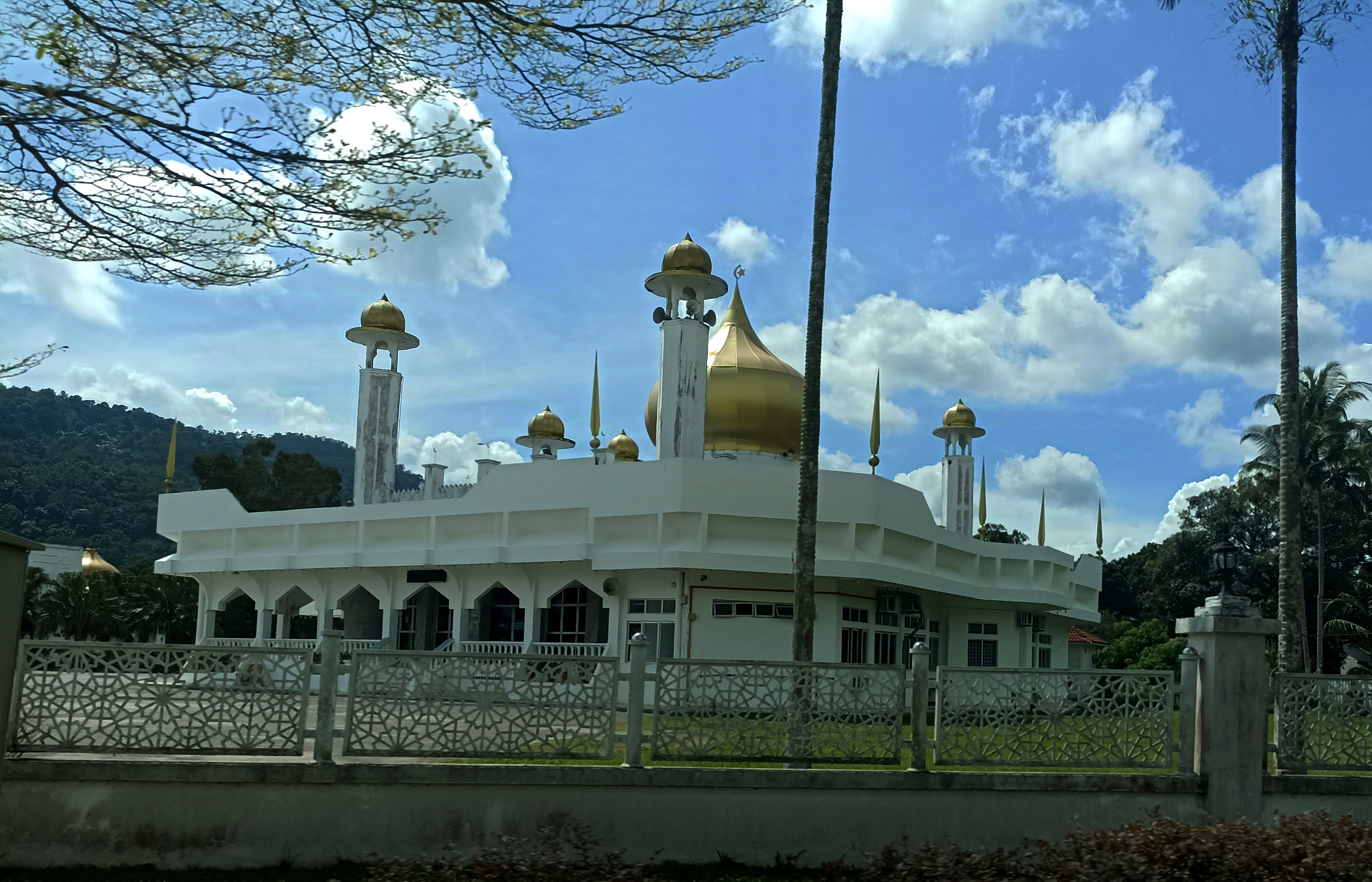
Tuanku Munawir Royal Mosque

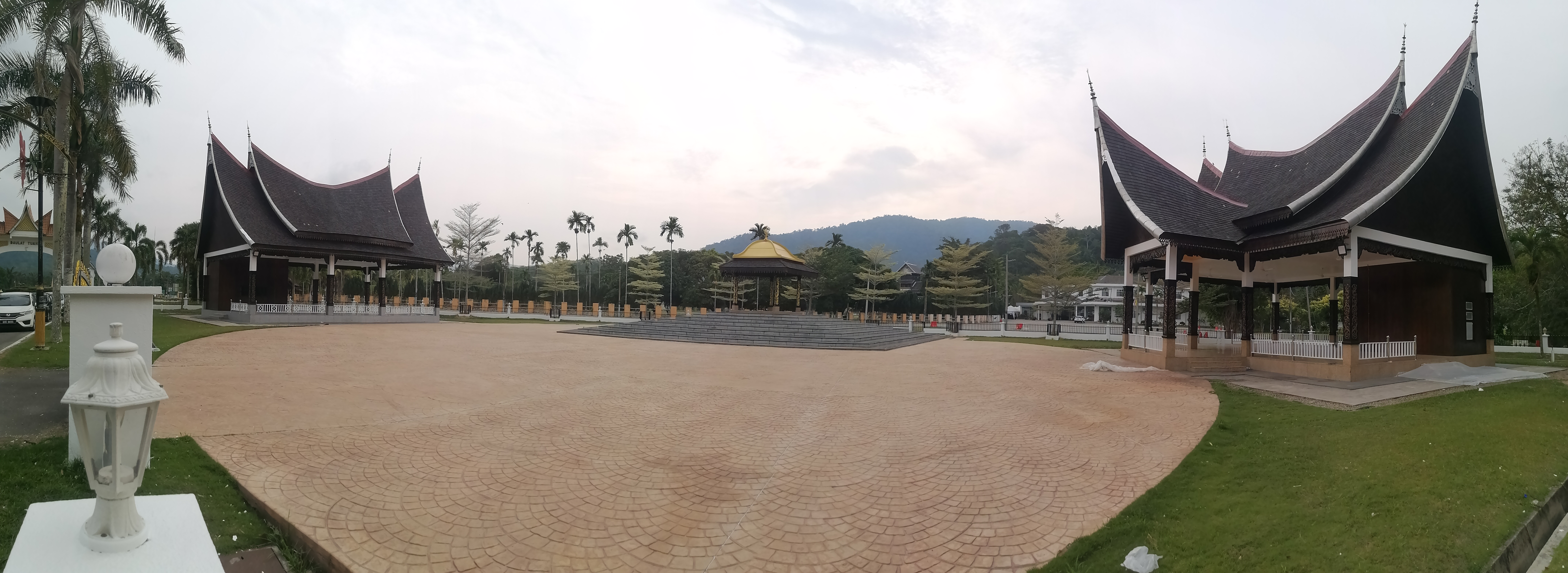
The Panca Persada, a place for performing ceremonial bath located nearby Istana Besar.

Completed in 1932, the official palace of the Yang Di-Pertuan Besar Negeri Sembilan is the Istana Besar. The palace complex consists of the Main Palace, the Throne Room (Balairong Seri), and the Royal Banquet Hall.

The old wooden palace, known as Istana Lama, was built and officiated during the reign of Yang Di-Pertuan Besar Tuanku Muhammad Shah ibni Almarhum Tuanku Antah (who reigned between 1888–1933). It was made in part of Chengal (Penak) wood Neobalanocarpus and ironwood or belian wood (Eusideroxylon zwageri) and held together using only wooden pegs. The palace took six years to build and was completed in 1908 at a cost of $45,000.00 at that time. The design has subtle hints of Minangkabau architecture; five levels rise to a height of 67 feet, or approximately twenty meters. The palace has 99 columns to support the main structure. The Istana Lama was a replacement for the Istana Pulih, which was burned down by British soldiers. The drawings and plans for Istana Lama were detailed by a Mr. Woodford of the Public Works Department, and based on the designs provided by two local craftsmen, Kahar and Taib. This palace was used until 1932, after which the Yang Di-Pertuan Besar moved to the Istana Besar. The Istana Lama has been designated as a national heritage site and was converted into a Royal Museum in 1992.

Other landmarks include the Seri Menanti Royal Mausoleum.

== Surrounding area ==
Among the villages in the area are Kampung Tanah Datar, Kampung Tengah, Kampung Gamin, Kampung Istana Lama, Kampung Sikai, Kampung Buyau, Kampung Batu Hampar, Kampung Mertang Seberang, Kampung Merual, Kampung Galau, Kampung Masjid Terbakar, Kampung Padang Biawas, Kampung Jumbang, Kampong Gunung Pasir, and others. A few traditionally styled houses, derivative of the Minangkabau design Rumah Gadang, remain standing around Seri Menanti and in the adjacent villages. A significant portion of the land in Seri Menanti is Malay Reserve and Malay Customary Land (Malay: Tanah Adat).

== The Tunku Besar of Seri Menanti ==
The incumbent Tunku Besar of Seri Menanti is Tunku Ali Redhauddin, the eldest son of the Yang Di-Pertuan Besar of Negeri Sembilan Tuanku Muhriz ibni Almarhum Tuanku Munawir. The title of Tunku Besar Seri Menanti is the most senior of the Putera Yang Empat (Four Princes). This is the third time in 120 years that the Tunku Besar Seri Menanti has been appointed.

== Heritage ==
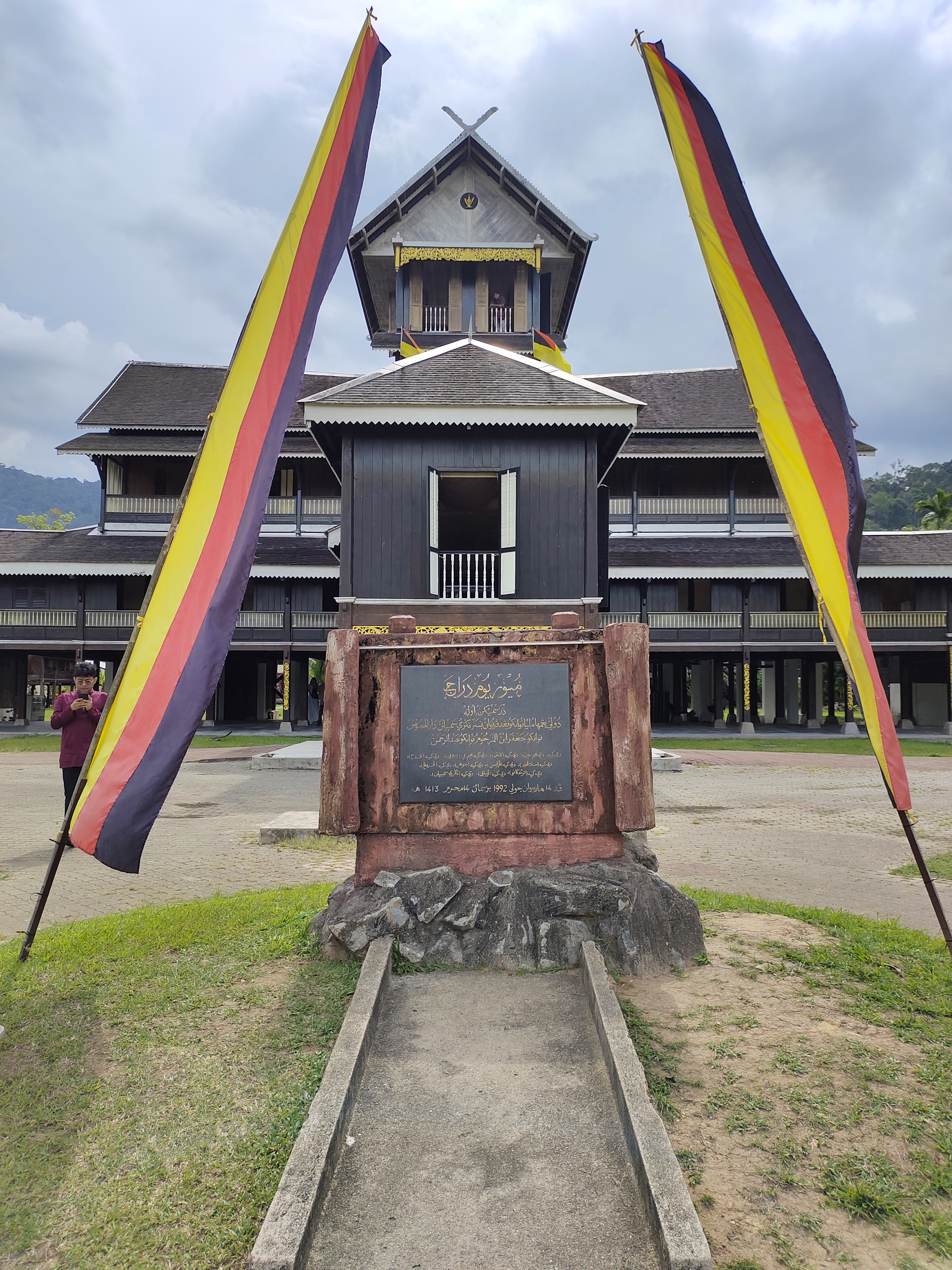
Inauguration plaque of the Royal Museum in Jawi with two vertical marawa

In February 2009, the Unity, Culture, Arts and Heritage Minister Datuk Seri Shafie Apdal announced that the Istana Lama Seri Menanti is among ten historical structures in Malaysia gazette as a national heritage, along with Victoria Institution in Kuala Lumpur and The Stadthuys in Malacca.

== Notable people ==
- Hattan, singer

== See also ==
- Yamtuan Besar
- Adat perpatih
- Adat
- Royal capitals of Malaysian states
