= Kolej Tuanku Ja'afar =

Coordinates: 2.8451432°N 101.8640941°E

- Mantin, Negeri Sembilan, 71700; Malaysia

Information
- Type: International British-style boarding school
- Motto: Loyalty, Learning, Leadership (Malay: Kepimpinan, Berilmu, Kesetiaan)
- Established: 1991
- Founders: Tunku Naquiyuddin ibni Almarhum Tuanku Ja'afar; Tunku Imran ibni Almarhum Tuanku Ja'afar; Tunku Naquiah ibni Almarhum Tuanku Ja'afar
- Principal: Dr. Glenn Moodie
- Gender: Coeducational
- Age: 3 to 18
- Enrollment: ~1200
- Campus size: 80 acres (32 ha)
- Houses: Irinah; Jawahir; Alia; Imran; Nadzaruddin; Naquiyuddin; Nadzimuddin; Naquiah; Rahman
- Colours: Maroon and Grey
- Affiliations: Headmaster's and Headmistress' Conference; Federation of British International Schools in Asia; Boarding Schools' Association; Council of British International Schools; Association of International Malaysian Schools; Council of International Schools
- Website: Official website

Kolej Tuanku Ja'afar (KTJ) is a private British international boarding school in Mantin, Seremban District, Negeri Sembilan, Malaysia, founded in 1991 by the Negeri Sembilan Royal Family. Its primary school is a day school for pupils between the ages of 4 and 11, while its secondary school offers boarding for students from the age of 11 to 19. Day schooling is also possible in the secondary school.

The school provides the National Curriculum for England, GCSE and A-levels.

== School affiliations ==
The school is a member of the Headmasters' and Headmistresses' Conference. The school is also a member of the Federation of British International Schools in South East Asia.
