= Tunku Naquiah =

Tunku Dara of Negeri Sembilan

- Tunku Dara
- Born: Tunku Naquiah binti Tunku Ja'afar; 29 December 1944 (age 81); Seri Menanti, Negeri Sembilan, Malaya (now Malaysia)
- Spouse: Tunku Mudzaffar bin Tunku Mustapha (m. 1969)
- Issue: Tunku Nadzimuddin; Tunku Myra Madihah; Tunku Nasaifuddin; Tunku Nasruan Adil
Regnal name
- Tunku Tan Sri Naquiah binti Almarhum Tuanku Ja'afar
- House: Pagar Ruyung
- Father: Tuanku Ja'afar
- Mother: Tunku Ampuan Najihah
- Religion: Sunni Islam

Tunku Tan Sri Naquiah binti Almarhum Tuanku Ja'afar is a member of the Negeri Sembilan royal family who is the Tunku Dara. She is the eldest daughter and first child of Tuanku Ja'afar, the 10th Yang di-Pertuan Besar of Negeri Sembilan and Tunku Ampuan Najihah.

== Personal life ==
She was born on 29 December 1944 at Seri Menanti, Negeri Sembilan.

Her other siblings;

- Tunku Naquiyuddin, the Tunku Laxamana (born on 8 Mac 1947)
- Tunku Imran, the Tunku Muda Serting (born on 21 March 1948)
- Tunku Jawahir, the Tunku Puteri (born on 27 January 1952)
- Tunku Irinah, the Tengku Panglima Raja of Selangor (born on 23 November 1957)
- Tunku Nadzaruddin (born on 26 October 1959)

== Education ==
The eldest of the six issues of Almarhum Tuanku Ja'afar ibni Almarhum Tuanku Abdul Rahman, Tunku Dara studied in Malay Girls College, Kuala Lumpur before pursuing her studies in New York and London. She holds a bachelor's degree in Economics/Political Science from the American University in Cairo. Upon returning to Malaysia, she began a successful Public Relations (PR) career during which she received a distinction for her Diploma in Public Relations from the Malaysian Institute of Public Relations (IPR) in 1971.

== Career ==
She is currently a director of Syarikat Pesaka Antah, Syarikat Pendidikan Staffield Bhd and the chairman of Munaq Holdings Sdn Bhd.

Since 1980, Tunku Dara Naquiah has run Ecole de Belle Jeunesse, a finishing school in Malaysia.

== Other work ==
Tunku Naquiah is on the board of trustees of Tuanku Ja'afar Educational Trust.

== Royal family ==
In 1969, she married Tunku Mudzaffar, the Tunku Kecil Besar.

== Styles and honours ==
Styles of Tunku Naquiah
- Reference style: Her Highness
- Spoken style: Your Highness
- Alternative style: Tunku Dara

The style of Tunku Naquiah is :

Her Highness Tunku Tan Sri Naquiah binti Almarhum Tuanku Ja'afar, D.K.Y.R., P.S.M., S.P.T.J., J.P., A.M.N., P.J.K., Tunku Dara

=== Honours ===
She has been awarded :

- Negeri Sembilan
  - Recipient of the Royal Family Order of Yam Tuan Radin Sunnah (D.K.Y.R., 16.8.1980)
  - Knight Grand Commander or Dato' Sri Paduka of the Grand Order of Tuanku Ja'afar (S.P.T.J.) with title Dato' Seri
  - The Meritorious Service Medal (Pingat Jasa Kebaktian, P.J.K.)
  - Recipient of Jaksa Pendamai (J.P)
- Malaysia
  - Member of the Order of the Defender of the Realm (A.M.N)
  - Commander of the Order of Loyalty to the Crown of Malaysia (P.S.M) with title Tan Sri
