= Abdul Samad Ibrahim =

Malaysian politician

Yang Berbahagia Dato' Abdul Samad Ibrahim DPNS DNS
- عبدالصمد بن إبراهيم

Member of the Negeri Sembilan State Executive Council
- In office 14 March 2008 – 21 May 2013 (Human Capital Development, Youth and Sports)
- Monarchs: Ja'afar (2008); Muhriz (2008–2013)
- Menteri Besar: Mohamad Hasan
- Preceded by: Mohd Rais Zainuddin
- Succeeded by: Zaifulbahri Idris
- Constituency: Seri Menanti

Member of the Negeri Sembilan State Legislative Assembly for Seri Menanti
- In office 8 March 2008 – 12 August 2023
- Preceded by: Ibrahim Jahaya (BN–UMNO)
- Succeeded by: Muhammad Sufian Maradzi (BN–UMNO)
- Majority: 2,191 (2008); 2,396 (2013); 595 (2018)

Faction represented in Negeri Sembilan State Legislative Assembly
- 2008–2023: Barisan Nasional

Personal details
- Born: Negeri Sembilan, Malaysia
- Citizenship: Malaysian
- Party: United Malays National Organisation (UMNO)
- Other political affiliations: Barisan Nasional (BN)
- Occupation: Politician

Abdul Samad bin Ibrahim is a Malaysian politician who served as Member of the Negeri Sembilan State Executive Council (EXCO) in the Barisan Nasional (BN) state administration under former Menteri Besar Mohamad Hasan from March 2008 to May 2013 and Member of the Negeri Sembilan State Legislative Assembly (MLA) for Seri Menanti from March 2008 to August 2023. He is a member of the United Malays National Organisation (UMNO), a component party of the BN coalition.

== Election results ==
Negeri Sembilan State Legislative Assembly
Year	Constituency	Candidate	Votes	Pct	Opponent(s)	Votes	Pct	Ballots cast	Majority	Turnout
2008	N16 Seri Menanti	Abdul Samad Ibrahim (UMNO)	3,934	69.30%	Mohamad Noor Abdul Rahman (PAS)	1,743	30.70%	5,825	2,191	76.11%
2013	N16 Seri Menanti	Abdul Samad Ibrahim (UMNO)	4,538	66.90%	Tengku Zamrah Tengku Sulaiman (PKR)	2,142	31.58%	6,937	2,396	84.40%
2013	N16 Seri Menanti	Abdul Samad Ibrahim (UMNO)	4,538	66.90%	Md Ali Mustafa (IND)	103	1.52%	6,937	2,396	84.40%
2018	N16 Seri Menanti	Abdul Samad Ibrahim (UMNO)	3,362	50.45%	Jamali Salam (BERSATU)	2,767	41.52%	6,800	595	83.40%
2018	N16 Seri Menanti	Abdul Samad Ibrahim (UMNO)	3,362	50.45%	Raifei Mustapha (PAS)	535	8.03%	6,800	595	83.40%

== Honours ==
- Negeri Sembilan
  - Knight Commander of the Order of Loyalty to Negeri Sembilan (DPNS) – Dato' (2010)
  - Companion of the Order of Loyalty to Negeri Sembilan (DNS) (2005)
