= KTJ =

KTJ may refer to:

- The post nominal of a Knight in the Knights Templar or Ordo Supremus Militaris Templi Hierosolymitani. A Knight wears a red, patriarchal cross edged in gold, suspended below a crown, on the red and black neck ribbon of the Order.
- Katibat al-Tawhid wal-Jihad, an Uzbek/Kyrgyz jihadist militant organization based in Syria
- Kyrgyz Railways
- Kolej Tuanku Ja'afar
