= Tuanku Ja'afar Royal Gallery =

Gallery in Seremban, Negeri Sembilan, Malaysia

- Galeri Diraja Tuanku Ja'afar
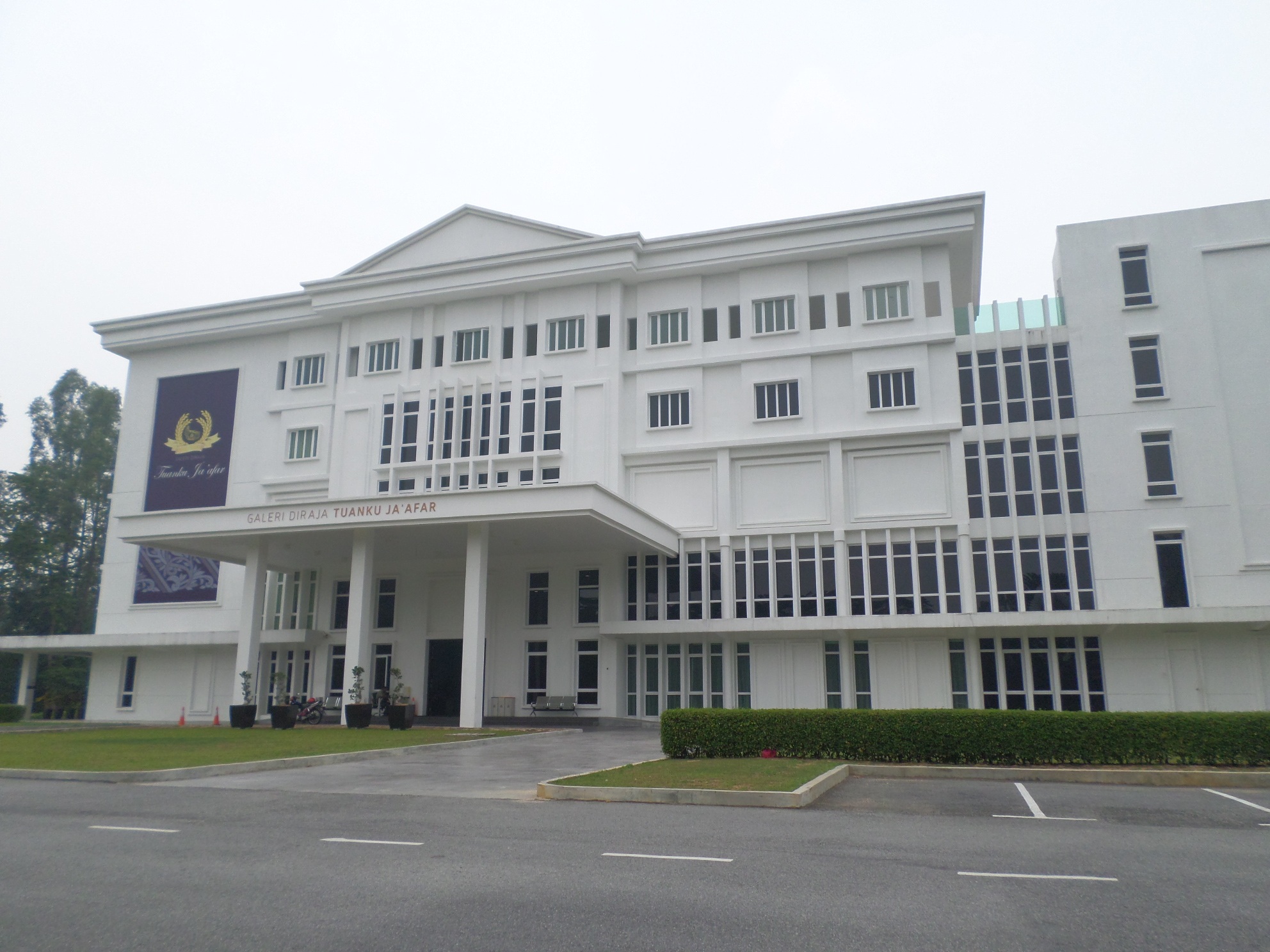
- Established: 4 December 2014
- Location: Seremban, Negeri Sembilan, Malaysia
- Coordinates: 2°43′30.5″N 101°56′46.0″E
- Type: Museum
- Website: gdtjns.com (in Malay)

The Tuanku Ja'afar Royal Gallery (Malay: Galeri Diraja Tuanku Ja'afar) is a gallery in Seremban, Negeri Sembilan, Malaysia. The gallery is about the former Negeri Sembilan Yang di-Pertuan Besar Tuanku Ja'afar.

== History ==
The gallery building started its construction on 2 May 2012 and completed in 2013. The first phase of the gallery was opened on 4 December 2014 by Tunku Ampuan Besar of Negeri Sembilan Tuanku Najihah.

== Architecture ==
The building has a concept of modern colonial architecture. The gallery is housed in a three-story building with an area of 4,087 m2 and divided into 9 exhibition halls. Six exhibitions hall are available for visitor viewing while another three halls are still under construction, which are:

- Introduction of Negeri Sembilan
- Getting to Know His Excellency
- Growing Up Period
- Early Works
- The 10th Yang di-Pertuan Besar of Negeri Sembilan
- The 19th Yang di-Pertuan Agong of Malaysia

== Exhibitions ==
The gallery exhibits the private collections and life of Tuanku Ja'afar.

== Transportation ==
The gallery is within walking distance north east of Seremban railway station.

== See also ==
- List of tourist attractions in Negeri Sembilan
- Yamtuan Besar
