= Royal Family Order of Negeri Sembilan =

Dynastic order of Negeri Sembilan

The Most Illustrious Royal Family Order of Negeri Sembilan Darjah Kerabat Negeri Sembilan Yang Amat Mulia

Awarded by Yamtuan Besar of Negeri Sembilan
- Type: Dynastic order
- Established: 24 May 1979
- Status: Currently constituted
- Founder: Tuanku Ja'afar
- Grand Master: Tuanku Muhriz
- Grades: Grand Principal (D.K.N.S.)

Precedence
- Next (higher): None (highest)
- Next (lower): Order of Negeri Sembilan
- Ribbon bar of the order

The Most Illustrious Royal Family Order of Negeri Sembilan (Malay: Darjah Kerabat Negeri Sembilan Yang Amat Mulia) is the highest chivalric and dynastic order of the state of Negeri Sembilan. The order was established on 24 May 1979 by Yamtuan Besar Tuanku Ja'afar to recognize the contributions made by heads of state and consorts to the state.

== History ==
The Royal Family Order of Negeri Sembilan was established on 24 May 1979 by Yamtuan Besar Tuanku Ja'afar. The order is conferred on the Sultans of the Malay states, their consorts, senior members of the Negeri Sembilan royal family, and foreign heads of state and their consorts.

== Grade and insignia ==
The Royal Family Order of Negeri Sembilan is conferred in the single grade of Member. The recipients of the order bear the post-nominal letters of D.K.N.S. The reigning monarch, or Yamtuan Besar, is the Grand Master of the order and all inductions are made at his pleasure.

The insignia of the order consists of a collar, sash, badge, and star. The sash of the order is a yellow riband with two central stripes in red and black.

== Recipients ==
- 1979: Ja'afar of Negeri Sembilan (Founding Grand Master)
- 1979: Tunku Ampuan Najihah
- 1980: Tunku Puan Besar Kurshiah
- 1980: Hassanal Bolkiah
- 1981: Ismail Petra of Kelantan
- 1982: Putra of Perlis
- 1982: Abdul Halim of Kedah
- 1982: Salahuddin of Selangor
- 1982: Mahathir Mohamad
- 1985: Iskandar of Johor
- 1986: Ahmad Shah of Pahang
- 1988: Mahmud of Terengganu
- 1989: Azlan Shah of Perak
- 1994: Tunku Naquiyuddin
- 1996: Sultanah Bahiyah
- 1998: Raja Perempuan Tengku Anis
- 2001: Mizan Zainal Abidin of Terengganu
- 2001: Sirajuddin of Perlis
- 2001: Pakubuwono XII
- 2002: Sharafuddin of Selangor
- 2009: Muhriz of Negeri Sembilan (Grand Master since 2008)
- 2009: Tuanku Aishah Rohani
- 2011: Ibrahim Iskandar of Johor
- 2011: Muhammad V of Kelantan
- 2015: Nazrin Shah of Perak
- 2018: Sallehuddin of Kedah

== See also ==
- Orders, decorations, and medals of the Malaysian states and federal territories#Negeri Sembilan
- Orders, decorations, and medals of Negeri Sembilan
- List of post-nominal letters (Negeri Sembilan)
