= Muhammad Sufian Maradzi =

Malaysian politician

Yang Berhormat Tuan Muhammad Sufian Maradzi ANS PMC PJK MLA

Member of the Negeri Sembilan State Legislative Assembly for Seri Menanti
- Incumbent
- Assumed office 12 August 2023
- Preceded by: Abdul Samad Ibrahim (BN–UMNO)
- Majority: 370 (2023)

Personal details
- Party: United Malays National Organisation (UMNO)
- Other political affiliations: Barisan Nasional (BN)
- Occupation: Politician

Muhammad Sufian bin Maradzi is a Malaysian politician who served as Member of the Negeri Sembilan State Legislative Assembly (MLA) for Seri Menanti since August 2023. He is a member of the United Malays National Organisation (UMNO), a component party of Barisan Nasional (BN).

== Election results ==
Negeri Sembilan State Legislative Assembly
Year	Constituency	Candidate	Votes	Pct	Opponent(s)	Votes	Pct	Ballots cast	Majority	Turnout
2023	N16 Seri Menanti	Muhammad Sufian Maradzi (UMNO)	3,711	52.62%	Jamali Salam (BERSATU)	3,341	47.38%	7,128	370	70.96%

== Honours ==
- Negeri Sembilan
  - Member of the Order of Loyalty to Negeri Sembilan (ANS) (2024)
  - Recipient of the Medal for Outstanding Public Service (PMC) (2016)
  - Recipient of the Meritorious Service Medal (PJK) (2011)
