= Seri Menanti Royal Mausoleum =

Mausoleum in Malaysia

Coordinates: 2.697640°N 102.161565°E

Seri Menanti Royal Mausoleum Makam Diraja Seri Menanti مقام دراج سري مننتي
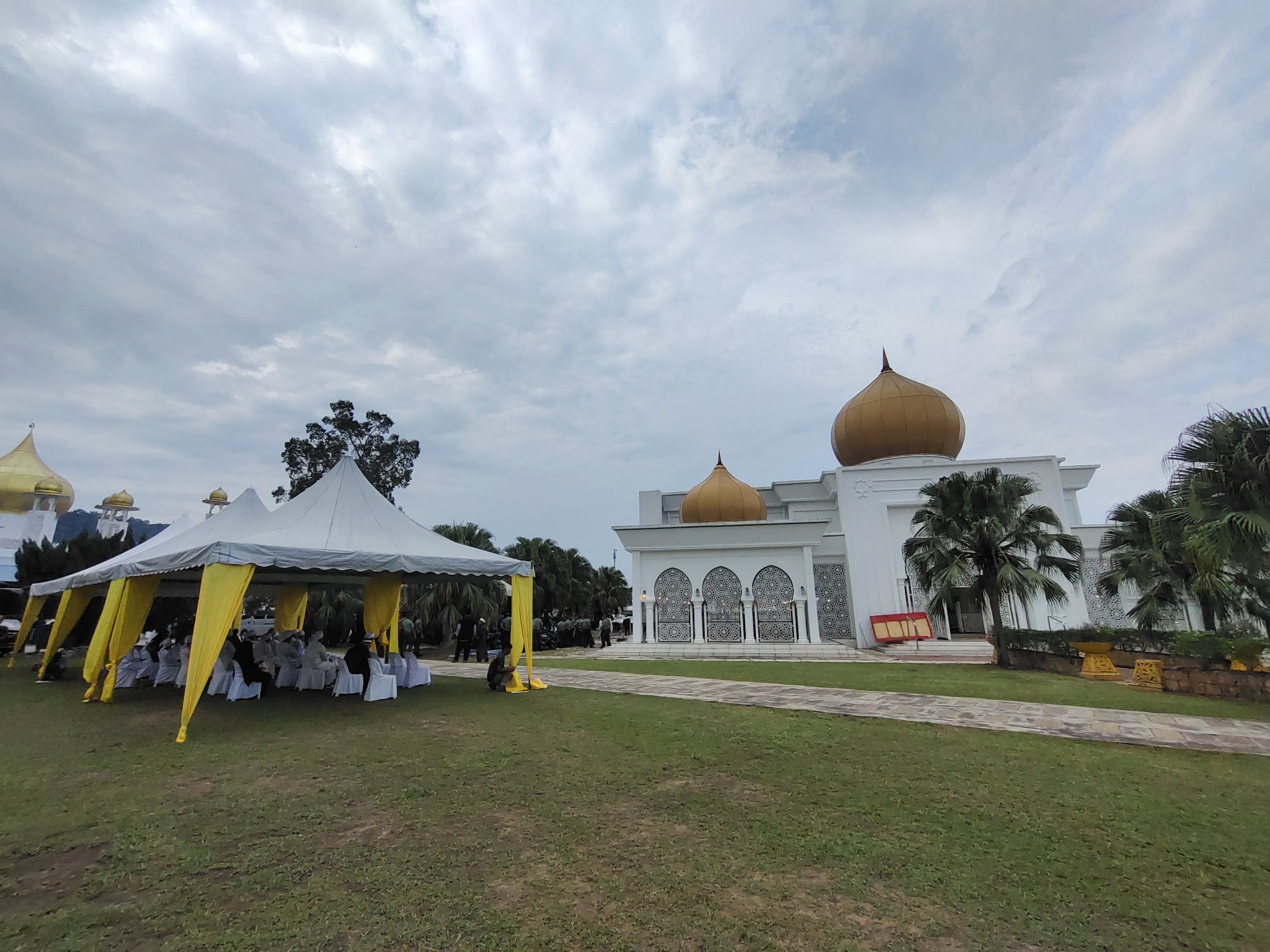

Religion
- Affiliation: Islam
- Leadership: Negeri Sembilan Royal Family

Location
- Location: Seri Menanti, Negeri Sembilan, Malaysia
- Interactive map of Seri Menanti Royal Mausoleum; Makam Diraja Seri Menanti مقام دراج سري مننتي

Architecture
- Type: Royal Mausoleum
- Style: Moghul

The Seri Menanti Royal Mausoleum (Malay: Makam Diraja Seri Menanti, Jawi: مقام دراج سري مننتي), is a royal mausoleum of the Negeri Sembilan royal family located in the royal town of Seri Menanti, Kuala Pilah District, Negeri Sembilan, Malaysia. This mausoleum is located next to the Tuanku Munawir Royal Mosque.

== List of graves ==
=== Yang di-Pertuan Besar (Great Chief Ruler/Sultan) graves ===
- Raja Hitam ibni Almarhum Sultan Bagagar Syah I – The 2nd Yamtuan of Negeri Sembilan
- Raja Ali ibni Almarhum Sultan Malenggang Alam – The 3rd Yamtuan of Negeri Sembilan
- Tuanku Nasiruddin Ibni Almarhum Raja Ali – The 4th Yamtuan of Negeri Sembilan
- Tuanku Ullin Ibni Almarhum Raja Ali – The 5th Yam Tuan of Negeri Sembilan
- Tuanku Antah Ibni Almarhum Tuanku Nasiruddin – The 6th Yamtuan of Negeri Sembilan/Seri Menanti
- Tuanku Muhammad Shah ibni Almarhum Tuanku Antah – The 7th Yang di-Pertuan Besar of Seri Menanti/Negeri Sembilan (died 1933)
- Tuanku Abdul Rahman ibni Almarhum Tuanku Muhammad Shah – The 8th Yang di-Pertuan Besar Negeri Sembilan and 1st Yang di-Pertuan Agong (1957–1960) (died 1960)
- Tuanku Munawir ibni Almarhum Tuanku Abdul Rahman – The 9th Yang di-Pertuan Besar Negeri Sembilan (died 1967)
- Tuanku Jaafar ibni Almarhum Tuanku Abdul Rahman – The 10th Yang di-Pertuan Besar of Negeri Sembilan and 10th Yang di-Pertuan Agong (1994–1999) (died 2008)

=== Tunku Ampuan Besar (Queen consort) graves ===
- Tunku Ampuan Kurshiah binti Almarhum Tunku Besar Burhanuddin – 1st Raja Permaisuri Agong (1957–1960) (died 1999)
- Tunku Ampuan Durah binti Almarhum Tunku Besar Burhanuddin – consort of Tuanku Munawir (1960–1967) (died 1999)
- Tunku Ampuan Najihah binti Tunku Besar Burhanuddin - consort of Tuanku Ja’afar (1967–2008) (died 2023)

== Royal family graves ==
- 1.Tunku Alang Hussein ibni Almarhum Tuanku Hitam - (Tunku Alang 1) (died: 1858)
  - 1.Tunku Muda Umar ibni Almarhum Tunku Alang Hussein - (Tunku Muda of Serting 1) (died: 1881)
    - 1.Tunku Muda Muhammad ibni Almarhum Tunku Muda Umar- (Tunku Muda of Serting 2) (died: 1861)
  - 2.Tunku Panglima Besar Hassan ibni Almarhum Tunku Alang Hussein - (Tunku Panglima Besar 1) (died: 1912)
- 2.Tunku Besar Ibrahim ibni Almarhum Tuanku Hitam - (Tunku Besar 1) (died: 1876)
- 1.Tunku Besar Daud ibni Almarhum Tuanku Nasiruddin - (Tunku Besar 2) (died: 1861)
- 2. Tunku Besar Lintau ibni Almarhum Tuanku Nasiruddin - (Tunku Besar 3) (died: 1961)
- 3.Tunku Abdullah ibni Almarhum Tuanku Nasiruddin - (Yang Dipertuan Muda of Jelebu 2) (died: 1961)
- 4. Tunku Muda Cik Aminuddin ibni Almarhum Tuanku Nasiruddin - (Tunku Muda Kechil 1) (died: 1961)
  - 1. Tunku Laksamana Said Abu Bakar ibni Almarhum Tunku Aminuddin - (Tunku Laksamana 1) (died: 1961)
  - 2.Tunku Laksamana Abdul Rahman ibni Almarhum Tunku Aminuddin]] - (Tunku Laksamana 2) (died: 1961)
- 5.Tunku Abdul Rahim ibni Almahum Tuanku Nasiruddin (died: 1961)
- 6.Tunku Laksamana Muhammad Hussein ibni Almarhum Tuanku Nasiruddin - (Tunku Laksamana 3) (died: 1961)
- 7. Tunku Laksamana Muhammad Yassin ibni Almarhum Tuanku Nasiruddin - (Tunku Laksamana 4) (died: 1961)
- 2.Tunku Haji Burhanuddin ibni Almarhum Tuanku Haji Antah - (Tunku Besar 4) (died: 1961)
- 3. Tunku Laxsamana Abdul Kahar ibni Almarhum Tuanku Antah - (Tunku Laksamana 5) (died: 1961)
- 4. Tunku Sulaiman ibni Almarhum Tuanku Antah - (died: 1961)
- 2.Tunku Abdul Aziz ibni Almarhum Tuanku Muhammad (died: 1916)
- 3.Tunku Laksamana Nasir ibni Almarhum Tuanku Muhammad - (Tunku Laksamana 6) (died: 1976)
- 4. Tunku Muhammad Alam Shah ibni Almarhum Tuanku Muhammad Shah - (died: 1977)
- 3.Tunku Abdullah ibni Almarhum Tuanku Abdul Rahman – (Tunku Panglima Besar 4) Chairman and founder of the Melewar Corporation (died: 2008)
- 3.Tunku Alif Hussein Saifuddin al-Amin ibni Tuanku Muhriz (died: 2016)
- Tunku Deanna binti Almarhum Tuanku Munawir (died: 2017)
