= List of tourist attractions in Negeri Sembilan =

Tourist attractions in Negeri Sembilan, Malaysia

This is the list of tourist attractions in Negeri Sembilan, Malaysia.

== Galleries ==
- Tuanku Ja'afar Royal Gallery

== Memorials ==
- Nilai Memorial Park

== Museums ==
- Custom Museum

== Nature ==
- Port Dickson

== Sport centres ==
- Tuanku Abdul Rahman Stadium

== See also ==
- List of tourist attractions in Malaysia
