= Seri Menanti (state constituency) =

Electoral district in Malaysia

Seri Menanti (N16)
Negeri Sembilan constituency

State constituency
- Legislature: Negeri Sembilan State Legislative Assembly
MLA
Muhammad Sufian Maradzi
BN
- Constituency created: 1959 (as Sri Menanti)
- First contested: 1959
- Last contested: 2026

Demographics
- Electors (2023): 10,045

N16 Seri Menanti within Negeri Sembilan, as used for the 2023 and 2026 state elections

Seri Menanti is a state constituency in Negeri Sembilan, Malaysia, that has been represented in the Negeri Sembilan State Legislative Assembly.

The state constituency was first contested in 1959 and is mandated to return a single Assemblyman to the Negeri Sembilan State Legislative Assembly under the first-past-the-post voting system.

== Demographics ==
Ethnic breakdown of Seri Menanti's electorate as of 2026
1. Malay (91.9%)
2. Other ethnicities (5.60%)
3. Chinese (2.10%)
4. Indian (0.30%)

== History ==
=== Polling districts ===
According to the federal gazette issued on 23 July 2026, the Seri Menanti constituency is divided into 13 polling districts.

| State constituency | Polling district | Code | Location |
|---|---|---|---|
| Seri Menanti（N16） | Kampong Langkap | 129/16/01 | Balai Raya Kampung Langkap |
| Seri Menanti（N16） | Kampong Ulu Bendol | 129/16/02 | SK Ulu Bendol |
| Seri Menanti（N16） | Terachi | 129/16/03 | SK Yamtuan Hitam |
| Seri Menanti（N16） | Kampong Talang | 129/16/04 | SK Talang |
| Seri Menanti（N16） | Kampong Gemetir | 129/16/05 | SMK Dato' Abdul Samad |
| Seri Menanti（N16） | Kampong Ibol | 129/16/06 | Dewan Orang Ramai Tanjung Ipoh |
| Seri Menanti（N16） | Kampong Tengah | 129/16/07 | SK Yamtuan Lenggang |
| Seri Menanti（N16） | Tanjong Ipoh | 129/16/08 | SK Dato' Idris |
| Seri Menanti（N16） | Kampung Gamin | 129/16/09 | Balai Raya Kampung Gamin |
| Seri Menanti（N16） | Kampong Buyau | 129/16/10 | SMK Tunku Besar Burhanuddin |
| Seri Menanti（N16） | Sri Menanti | 129/16/11 | SK Tunku Laksamana Nasir |
| Seri Menanti（N16） | Kampung Sikai | 129/16/12 | Balai Raya Kampung Sikai |
| Seri Menanti（N16） | Gunong Pasir | 129/16/13 | SK Yamtuan Antah Gunung Pasir |

=== Representation history ===
Members of Assembly for Seri Menanti
| Assembly | No | Years | Name | Party |
Constituency created
Sri Menanti
| 1st | N10 | 1959-1964 | Abdul Samad Idris | Alliance (UMNO) |
| 2nd | N10 | 1964-1969 | Abdul Samad Idris | Alliance (UMNO) |
| | | 1969-1971 | Assembly was dissolved | |
| 3rd | N10 | 1971-1973 | Mansor Othman | Alliance (UMNO) |
| 3rd | N10 | 1973-1974 | Mansor Othman | BN (UMNO) |
| 4th | N13 | 1974-1978 | Mansor Othman | BN (UMNO) |
| 5th | N13 | 1978-1982 | Ahmad Kasim | BN (UMNO) |
| 6th | N13 | 1982-1986 | Ahmad Kasim | BN (UMNO) |
Seri Menanti
| 7th | N16 | 1986-1990 | Ramli Ujang | BN (UMNO) |
| 8th | N16 | 1990-1995 | Mohd Mokhtar Mohd Yasin | BN (UMNO) |
| 9th | N17 | 1995-1999 | Hashimuddin Abdul Kadir | BN (UMNO) |
| 10th | N17 | 1999-2004 | Ibrahim Jahaya | BN (UMNO) |
| 11th | N16 | 2004-2008 | Ibrahim Jahaya | BN (UMNO) |
| 12th | N16 | 2008-2013 | Abdul Samad Ibrahim | BN (UMNO) |
| 13th | N16 | 2013-2018 | Abdul Samad Ibrahim | BN (UMNO) |
| 14th | N16 | 2018-2023 | Abdul Samad Ibrahim | BN (UMNO) |
| 15th | N16 | 2023–2026 | Muhammad Sufian Maradzi | BN (UMNO) |

== Election results ==
Negeri Sembilan state election, 2026
| Party | Candidate | Votes | % | ∆% |
|---|---|---|---|---|
| BN | Muhammad Sufian Maradzi | 5,858 | 75.53 | ▲22.91 |
| PH | Mohd Kamarul Arifin Mohd | 1,535 | 19.79 | ▲19.79 |
| BERSATU | Megat D Shahriman Zaharudin | 363 | 4.68 | ▲4.68 |
| Total valid votes | | 7,756 | 100.00 | |
| Total rejected ballots | | 84 | | |
| Unreturned ballots | | 5 | | |
| Turnout | | 7,845 | 77.63 | ▲6.67 |
| Registered electors | | 10,105 | | |
| Majority | | 4,323 | 55.74 | ▲50.50 |
| BN hold | | Swing | | |

Negeri Sembilan state election, 2023
| Party | Candidate | Votes | % | ∆% |
|---|---|---|---|---|
| BN | Muhammad Sufian Maradzi | 3,711 | 52.62 | ▲2.17 |
| PN | Jamali Salam | 3,341 | 47.38 | ▲47.38 |
| Total valid votes | | 7,052 | 100.00 | |
| Total rejected ballots | | 69 | | |
| Unreturned ballots | | 7 | | |
| Turnout | | 7,128 | 70.96 | ▼12.43 |
| Registered electors | | 10,045 | | |
| Majority | | 370 | 5.24 | ▼3.69 |
| BN hold | | Swing | | |

Negeri Sembilan state election, 2018
| Party | Candidate | Votes | % | ∆% |
|---|---|---|---|---|
| BN | Abdul Samad Ibrahim | 3,362 | 50.45 | ▼16.45 |
| PH | Jamali Salam | 2,767 | 41.52 | ▲41.52 |
| PAS | Rafiei Mustapha | 535 | 8.03 | ▲8.03 |
| Total valid votes | | 6,664 | 100.00 | |
| Total rejected ballots | | 113 | | |
| Unreturned ballots | | 23 | | |
| Turnout | | 6,800 | 83.39 | ▼1.05 |
| Registered electors | | 8,154 | | |
| Majority | | 595 | 8.93 | ▼26.39 |
| BN hold | | Swing | | |

Negeri Sembilan state election, 2013
| Party | Candidate | Votes | % | ∆% |
|---|---|---|---|---|
| BN | Abdul Samad Ibrahim | 4,538 | 66.90 | ▼2.40 |
| PKR | Tengku Zamrah Tengku Sulaiman | 2,142 | 31.58 | ▲31.58 |
| Independent | Md Ali Mustafa | 103 | 1.52 | ▲1.52 |
| Total valid votes | | 6,783 | 100.00 | |
| Total rejected ballots | | 154 | | |
| Unreturned ballots | | 29 | | |
| Turnout | | 6,966 | 84.44 | ▲8.33 |
| Registered electors | | 8,250 | | |
| Majority | | 2,396 | 35.32 | ▼3.28 |
| BN hold | | Swing | | |

Negeri Sembilan state election, 2008
| Party | Candidate | Votes | % | ∆% |
|---|---|---|---|---|
| BN | Abdul Samad Ibrahim | 3,934 | 69.30 | ▲6.13 |
| PAS | Mohamad Noor Abdul Rahman | 1,743 | 30.70 | ▼6.13 |
| Total valid votes | | 5,677 | 100.00 | |
| Total rejected ballots | | 139 | | |
| Unreturned ballots | | 9 | | |
| Turnout | | 5,825 | 76.11 | ▲0.50 |
| Registered electors | | 7,653 | | |
| Majority | | 2,191 | 38.59 | ▲12.25 |
| BN hold | | Swing | | |

Negeri Sembilan state election, 2004
| Party | Candidate | Votes | % | ∆% |
|---|---|---|---|---|
| BN | Ibrahim Jahaya | 3,736 | 63.17 | ▲8.97 |
| PAS | Abd. Rahim Yusof | 2,178 | 36.83 | ▼8.97 |
| Total valid votes | | 5,914 | 100.00 | |
| Total rejected ballots | | 171 | | |
| Unreturned ballots | | 0 | | |
| Turnout | | 6,085 | 75.62 | ▲3.86 |
| Registered electors | | 8,047 | | |
| Majority | | 1,558 | 26.34 | ▲17.94 |
| BN hold | | Swing | | |

Negeri Sembilan state election, 1999
| Party | Candidate | Votes | % | ∆% |
|---|---|---|---|---|
| BN | Ibrahim Jahaya | 3,069 | 54.20 | ▼34.60 |
| PAS | Mohamad Noor Abdul Rahman | 2,593 | 45.80 | ▲45.80 |
| Total valid votes | | 5,662 | 100.00 | |
| Total rejected ballots | | 207 | | |
| Unreturned ballots | | 11 | | |
| Turnout | | 5,880 | 71.76 | ▲3.58 |
| Registered electors | | 8,194 | | |
| Majority | | 476 | 8.41 | ▼69.20 |
| BN hold | | Swing | | |

Negeri Sembilan state election, 1995
| Party | Candidate | Votes | % | ∆% |
|---|---|---|---|---|
| BN | Hashimuddin Abdul Kadir | 4,625 | 88.81 | ▲17.13 |
| S46 | Tengku Adinan Tengku Hassan | 583 | 11.19 | ▼14.29 |
| Total valid votes | | 5,208 | 100.00 | |
| Total rejected ballots | | 175 | | |
| Unreturned ballots | | 11 | | |
| Turnout | | 5,394 | 68.18 | ▼5.61 |
| Registered electors | | 7,911 | | |
| Majority | | 4,042 | 77.61 | ▲31.42 |
| BN hold | | Swing | | |

Negeri Sembilan state election, 1990
| Party | Candidate | Votes | % | ∆% |
|---|---|---|---|---|
| BN | Mohd Mokhtar Mohd Yasin | 3,943 | 71.68 | ▼8.76 |
| S46 | Aspan Alias | 1,402 | 25.49 | ▲25.49 |
| PAS | Mohamed Noh Muharam | 156 | 2.84 | ▼16.72 |
| Total valid votes | | 5,501 | 100.00 | |
| Total rejected ballots | | 228 | | |
| Unreturned ballots | | 14 | | |
| Turnout | | 5,743 | 73.79 | ▲7.10 |
| Registered electors | | 7,783 | | |
| Majority | | 2,541 | 46.19 | ▼14.69 |
| BN hold | | Swing | | |

Negeri Sembilan state election, 1986
| Party | Candidate | Votes | % | ∆% |
|---|---|---|---|---|
| BN | Ramli Ujang | 4,216 | 80.44 | ▼3.05 |
| PAS | Mohamed Noh Muharam | 1,025 | 19.56 | ▲3.05 |
| Total valid votes | | 5,241 | 100.00 | |
| Total rejected ballots | | 274 | | |
| Unreturned ballots | | 0 | | |
| Turnout | | 5,515 | 66.69 | ▼7.63 |
| Registered electors | | 8,270 | | |
| Majority | | 3,191 | 60.89 | ▼6.10 |
| BN hold | | Swing | | |

Negeri Sembilan state election, 1982
| Party | Candidate | Votes | % | ∆% |
|---|---|---|---|---|
| BN | Ahmad Kasim | 3,956 | 83.50 | ▲25.63 |
| PAS | Mohamed Saleh Ibrahim | 782 | 16.50 | ▲10.58 |
| Total valid votes | | 4,738 | 100.00 | |
| Total rejected ballots | | 190 | | |
| Unreturned ballots | | 0 | | |
| Turnout | | 4,928 | 74.32 | ▼4.45 |
| Registered electors | | 6,631 | | |
| Majority | | 3,174 | 66.99 | ▲45.34 |
| BN hold | | Swing | | |

Negeri Sembilan state election, 1978
| Party | Candidate | Votes | % | ∆% |
|---|---|---|---|---|
| BN | Ahmad Kasim | 2,667 | 57.87 | ▼15.73 |
| Independent | Tengku Ahmad Bab | 1,669 | 36.21 | ▲9.81 |
| PAS | Abd Kadir Sudin | 273 | 5.92 | ▲5.92 |
| Total valid votes | | 4,609 | 100.00 | |
| Total rejected ballots | | 280 | | |
| Unreturned ballots | | 0 | | |
| Turnout | | 4,889 | 78.77 | ▲0.09 |
| Registered electors | | 6,207 | | |
| Majority | | 998 | 21.65 | ▼25.54 |
| BN hold | | Swing | | |

Negeri Sembilan state election, 1974
| Party | Candidate | Votes | % | ∆% |
|---|---|---|---|---|
| BN | Mansor Othman | 3,214 | 73.60 | ▲6.14 |
| Independent | Zainal Abidin Bador | 1,153 | 26.40 | ▲26.40 |
| Total valid votes | | 4,367 | 100.00 | |
| Total rejected ballots | | 98 | | |
| Unreturned ballots | | 0 | | |
| Turnout | | 4,465 | 78.68 | ▲1.98 |
| Registered electors | | 5,675 | | |
| Majority | | 2,061 | 47.19 | ▲12.27 |
| BN gain from Alliance | | Swing | | - |

Negeri Sembilan state election, 1969: Sri Menanti
| Party | Candidate | Votes | % | ∆% |
|---|---|---|---|---|
| Alliance | Mansor Othman | 3,450 | 67.46 | ▼9.88 |
| PMIP | Tunku Abdul Rahim Tunku Muda Chik | 1,664 | 32.54 | ▲22.54 |
| Total valid votes | | 5,114 | 100.00 | |
| Total rejected ballots | | 366 | | |
| Unreturned ballots | | 0 | | |
| Turnout | | 5,480 | 76.70 | ▼5.18 |
| Registered electors | | 7,145 | | |
| Majority | | 1,786 | 34.92 | ▼29.75 |
| Alliance hold | | Swing | | |

Negeri Sembilan state election, 1964: Sri Menanti
| Party | Candidate | Votes | % | ∆% |
|---|---|---|---|---|
| Alliance | Abdul Samad Idris | 4,324 | 77.34 | ▲16.41 |
| Socialist Front | Jaalam Othman | 708 | 12.66 | ▲12.66 |
| PMIP | Abd. Majid Abd. Wahab | 559 | 10.00 | ▼15.24 |
| Total valid votes | | 5,591 | 100.00 | |
| Total rejected ballots | | 229 | | |
| Unreturned ballots | | 0 | | |
| Turnout | | 5,820 | 81.88 | ▲1.04 |
| Registered electors | | 7,108 | | |
| Majority | | 3,616 | 64.68 | ▲28.98 |
| Alliance hold | | Swing | | |

Negeri Sembilan state election, 1959: Sri Menanti
| Party | Candidate | Votes | % |
|---|---|---|---|
| Alliance | Abdul Samad Idris | 2,965 | 60.93 |
| PMIP | Jallam Othman | 1,228 | 25.24 |
| Independent | Raja Harun Raja Tachik | 673 | 13.83 |
| Total valid votes | | 4,866 | 100.00 |
| Total rejected ballots | | 84 | |
| Unreturned ballots | | 0 | |
| Turnout | | 4,950 | 80.84 |
| Registered electors | | 6,123 | |
| Majority | | 1,737 | 35.70 |
This was a new seat created.
