= Tunku Besar Burhanuddin =

- Tunku Besar of Seri Menanti
- Born: 22 September 1878; Seri Menanti, Negeri Sembilan, Federated Malay States, British Malaya
- Died: 5 July 1961 (aged 82); Istana Baroh, Seri Menanti, Negeri Sembilan, Malaya
- Burial: Seri Menanti Royal Mausoleum, Seri Menanti, Negeri Sembilan, Malaya
- Spouse: Tunku Sharifah Alawiyah Binti Sayyid Abdul Hamid (m. 1907; died 1949) Cik Halija Binti Haji Umar (m. 1911; died 1968)
- Issue: Tunku Mustapha; Tunku Mohamed; Tunku Indrian; Tunku Daud; Tunku Adnan; Tunku Mahmud; Tunku Shahabuddin; Tunku Puan Besar Kurshiah; Tunku Hamdah; Tuanku Ampuan Duratun Nafisah Azibah; Tunku Sharifah Alawiyah; Tunku Muhammad Jamil; Tunku Ahmad; Tunku Ghariba; Tunku Zahariah; Tunku Ampuan Najihah
Names
- Tunku Besar Burhanuddin Ibni Almarhum Tuanku Antah
- Dynasty: Pagaruyung
- Father: Tuanku Antah ibni Almarhum Yamtuan Radin
- Mother: Encik Puan Besar Halimah Binti Uggoh
- Religion: Sunni Islam

Tunku Besar Burhanuddin ibni Almarhum Yamtuan Antah CMG (22 September 1878 – 5 July 1961) was a member of the Negeri Sembilan royal family and once served as regent of Negeri Sembilan. His father was Yamtuan Antah ibni Yamtuan RadIn, who served as the 6th Yamtuan Besar (now known as Yang di-Pertuan Besar of Negeri Sembilan) from 1869 to 1888. Tunku Burhanuddin's elder brother, Tuanku Muhammad became the 7th Yamtuan Besar and the first to use the title Yang di-Pertuan Besar upon Yamtuan Antah's death.

== Title ==
Tunku Besar (Malay literally meaning "grand prince") is the title of the heir presumptive of the throne of Negeri Sembilan, Malaysia. In ancient times it was also the title of the heir apparent of Melaka, Johor, Pahang (all in Malaysia) as well as several Malay sultanates in Sumatra, Indonesia.

== Genealogy ==
Tunku Burhanuddin is best known as father of Negeri Sembilan queens. Three of his daughters served as Tunku Ampuan or queen consorts. His eldest daughter, Tunku Kurshiah binti Almarhum Tunku Besar Burhanuddin was married to Tuanku Abdul Rahman and was Tunku Ampuan from 1933 to 1960. She was succeeded as Tunku Ampuan by her sister and Tunku Burhanuddin's second daughter, Tunku Ampuan Durah, who was married to Tunku Munawir. Tunku Burhanuddin's youngest daughter, Tuanku Najihah was the Tunku Ampuan of Negeri Sembilan from 1967 to 2008.

Both Tunku Kurshiah and Tuanku Najihah also served a five-year term as Raja Permaisuri Agong or Queen of Malaysia.

His granddaughter, Tuanku Bahiyah, daughter of Tunku Kurshiah, was Sultanah of Kedah and also served a term as Raja Permaisuri Agong. His grandson, Tuanku Muhriz, son of Tunku Ampuan Durah is the current Yang di-Pertuan Besar of Negeri Sembilan.

Tunku Besar Burhanuddin died in 1961.

== Foreign honours ==
- United Kingdom
  - Honorary Companion of the Order of St Michael and St George (CMG) (3 June 1935)
