= Tunku Puan Besar Kurshiah =

Raja Permaisuri Agong from 1957 to 1960

Kurshiah قرشية
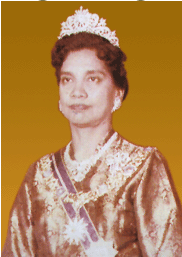

Queen consort of the Federation of Malaya
- Tenure: 31 August 1957 – 1 April 1960
- Successor: Raja Jemaah

Tunku Ampuan Besar of Negeri Sembilan
- Tenure: 21 April 1934 – 1 April 1960
- Successor: Tunku Ampuan Durah

Tunku Puan Besar of Negeri Sembilan
- Tenure: 1 April 1960 — 2 February 1999
- Born: 16 May 1911; Istana Baroh, Seri Menanti, Negeri Sembilan, Federated Malay States, British Malaya
- Died: 2 February 1999 (aged 87); Kuala Lumpur, Malaysia
- Burial: Seri Menanti Royal Mausoleum, Seri Menanti, Negeri Sembilan, Malaysia
- Spouse: Tuanku Abdul Rahman ibni Almarhum Tuanku Muhammad (m. 1929; died 1960)
- Issue: Tunku Bahiyah; Tunku Shahariah
Names
- Tunku Kurshiah binti Tunku Burhanuddin
Regnal name
- Tunku Ampuan Kurshiah binti Almarhum Tunku Besar Burhanuddin
- House: Pagaruyung - House of Yamtuan Raden
- Father: Tunku Besar Burhanuddin ibni Almarhum Tuanku Antah
- Mother: Che Puan Sharifah Alawiyah
- Religion: Sunni Islam

Tunku Puan Besar Hajah Kurshiah binti Almarhum Tunku Besar Burhanuddin (Jawi: تونكو ڤوان بسر حاجه قرشية بنت المرحوم تونكو بسر برهان الدين; 16 May 1911 – 2 February 1999) was the Tunku Puan Besar of Negeri Sembilan. She was previously the Tunku Ampuan Besar (Queen consort) of Negeri Sembilan from 1934 until 1960. She was the 1st Raja Permaisuri Agong (Queen of the Federation of Malaya) after the country gained it's independence in 1957. She reign alongside her husband from 1957 to 1960.

Tunku Kurshiah's sister, Tunku Durah married her stepson Tuanku Munawir Ibni Al-Marhum Tuanku Abdul Rahman and succeeded her as Tunku Ampuan Besar in 1960.

== Early life ==
Born on 16 May 1911 in Seri Menanti, Negeri Sembilan, she was the eldest daughter of Tunku Besar Burhanuddin ibni Almarhum Tuanku Antah (sometime Regent of Negeri Sembilan). She received her early education at the Seri Menanti Malay School. She also attended private English classes.

== Becoming queen ==
Tuanku Kurshiah married Tuanku Abdul Rahman ibni Almarhum Tuanku Muhammad, the ruler of Negeri Sembilan as his third wife on 21 May 1929. They had two daughters; Tuanku Bahiyah, who became Sultanah of Kedah and Tunku Shahariah, who became the wife of Tunku Abdul Rahman, the Tunku Bendahara of Johor.

Upon her husband's accession to the throne of Negeri Sembilan in 1933, Tunku Kurshiah was proclaimed Tunku Ampuan Besar or Queen Consort of Negeri Sembilan.

In 1957, her husband was elected as the first Yang di-Pertuan Agong of independent Malaya (later Malaysia) and she became the first Raja Permaisuri Agong or Queen.

Tuanku Abdul Rahman died in April 1960 and Tunku Kurshiah was given the title of Tunku Puan Besar of Negeri Sembilan.

== Social contributions ==
In 1954, Tuanku Kurshiah was appointed as the President of the Negeri Sembilan Girl Guides. She was also the patron of the Women’s Institute of Negeri Sembilan. In May 1961, she established the Muslim Women Welfare Council as the Founder President. On 27 October 1974, she was awarded the Tun Fatimah Gold Medal by the National Council of Women’s Organisations for her contribution in elevating the standard of women and children through welfare and education.

== Death ==
Tunku Kurshiah died in her sleep at 4:50 pm due to old age and from an illness in Kuala Lumpur on 2 February 1999 and her remains were buried at the Seri Menanti Royal Mausoleum in Seri Menanti.

== Family of queens ==
Tunku Kurshiah due to her royal lineage has links to many former queens of Negeri Sembilan but also has links with many of the royal families of the other states. Her daughter Tuanku Bahiyah became Sultanah of Kedah and later the fifth Raja Permaisuri Agong. Both her younger sisters succeeded her as Tunku Ampuan Besar, first by Tunku Ampuan Durah who was married to her eldest stepson Tuanku Munawir and second by her youngest sister Tuanku Najihah, who married her youngest stepson Tuanku Jaafar ibni Almarhum Tuanku Abdul Rahman. Tuanku Najihah also followed in Tunku Kurshiah's footsteps and served as the 10th Raja Permaisuri Agong.

== Awards and recognitions ==
=== Honours of Negeri Sembilan ===
- Member of the Royal Family Order of Negeri Sembilan (DKNS, 16 August 1980)

=== Honours of Malaysia ===
- Malaysia
  - Recipient of the Order of the Crown of the Realm (DMN, 1980)
  - Grand Commander of the Order of the Defender of the Realm (SMN) – Tun (31 August 1958)
- Kedah
  - Member of the Royal Family Order of Kedah (DK, 20 January 1991)

=== Places named after her ===
Several places were named after her, including:

- Jalan Tunku Kurshiah in Seremban, Negeri Sembilan
- Taman Tunku Kurshiah (residential area in Seremban)
- Tunku Kurshiah College (renamed from Maktab Perempuan Melayu)
- SK Tunku Kurshiah, primary school in Kuala Pilah, Negeri Sembilan
- SMK Tunku Kurshiah, secondary school in Kuala Pilah, Negeri Sembilan
- The University of Malaya also renamed its Third Residential College to Tunku Kurshiah Residential College.

== See also ==
- Yang di-Pertuan Agong
- Raja Permaisuri Agong

Malaysian royalty
Preceded by New Title	Raja Permaisuri Agong (Queen of Malaysia)	Succeeded by Raja Jemaah (Tunku Ampuan of Selangor)
