= Tunku Ampuan Najihah =

Raja Permaisuri Agong from 1994 to 1999

Najihah ناجحة
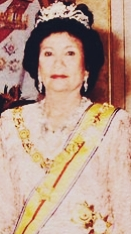

Queen consort of Malaysia
- Tenure: 26 April 1994 – 25 April 1999
- Installation: 22 September 1994
- Predecessor: Tuanku Bainun
- Successor: Tuanku Siti Aishah

Tunku Ampuan Besar of Negeri Sembilan
- Tenure: 18 April 1967 – 27 December 2008
- Installation: 8 April 1968
- Predecessor: Tunku Ampuan Durah
- Successor: Tuanku Aishah Rohani

Tunku Ampuan of Negeri Sembilan
- Tenure: 27 December 2008 — 8 September 2023
- Predecessor: Tunku Ampuan Durah

1st Chancellor Universiti Sains Islam Malaysia
- Successor: Tuanku Aishah Rohani
- Born: Tunku Najihah binti Tunku Burhanuddin; 1 September 1923; Seri Menanti, Negeri Sembilan, Federated Malay States
- Died: 8 September 2023 (aged 100); Cardiac Vascular Sentral Hospital, Kuala Lumpur, Malaysia
- Burial: 8 September 2023; Seri Menanti Royal Mausoleum, Kuala Pilah, Negeri Sembilan
- Spouse: Ja'afar of Negeri Sembilan (m. 1942; died 2008)
- Issue: Tunku Naquiah; Tunku Naquiyuddin; Tunku Imran; Tunku Jawahir; Tunku Irinah; Tunku Nadzaruddin
Names
- Tunku Najihah binti Almarhum Tunku Besar Burhanuddin
Regnal name
- Tuanku Najihah (as Queen consort); Tunku Ampuan Najihah (as Queen dowager)
- Dynasty: Pagaruyung
- Father: Tunku Besar Burhanuddin ibni Almarhum Tuanku Antah
- Mother: Cik Halija binti Haji Umar
- Religion: Sunni Islam

Tunku Ampuan Najihah binti Almarhum Tunku Besar Burhanuddin (Jawi: تونكو امڤوان ناجحة بنت المرحوم تونكو بسر برهان الدين; 1 September 1923 – 8 September 2023) was the Tunku Ampuan (Queen dowager) of Negeri Sembilan from 2008 until her death in 2023. She was formerly the Tunku Ampuan Besar (Queen consort) of Negeri Sembilan from 1967 to 2008. She also served as the 10th Raja Permaisuri Agong (Queen of Malaysia) between 1994 and 1999.

Tuanku Najihah was married to the former Yang di-Pertuan Besar Negeri Sembilan Tuanku Jaafar ibni Almarhum Tuanku Abdul Rahman. Tuanku Jaafar is also the stepson of Tuanku Najihah's sister, Tunku Kurshiah binti Almarhum Tunku Besar Burhanuddin, who also served as Tunku Ampuan Besar. Tuanku Najihah succeeded her sister, Tunku Ampuan Durah as Tunku Ampuan Besar in 1967.

== Early life ==
Daughter of Tunku Besar Burhanuddin ibni Almarhum Tuanku Antah (sometime Regent of Negeri Sembilan) and born on 1 September 1923, Tuanku Najihah received her formal education at the Tuanku Muhammad School in Kuala Pilah, Negeri Sembilan. She graduated from the London School of Oriental Studies. She also attended the special language and training course provided for the wives of diplomats while Tuanku Ja’afar was pursuing a course in diplomatic services in London.

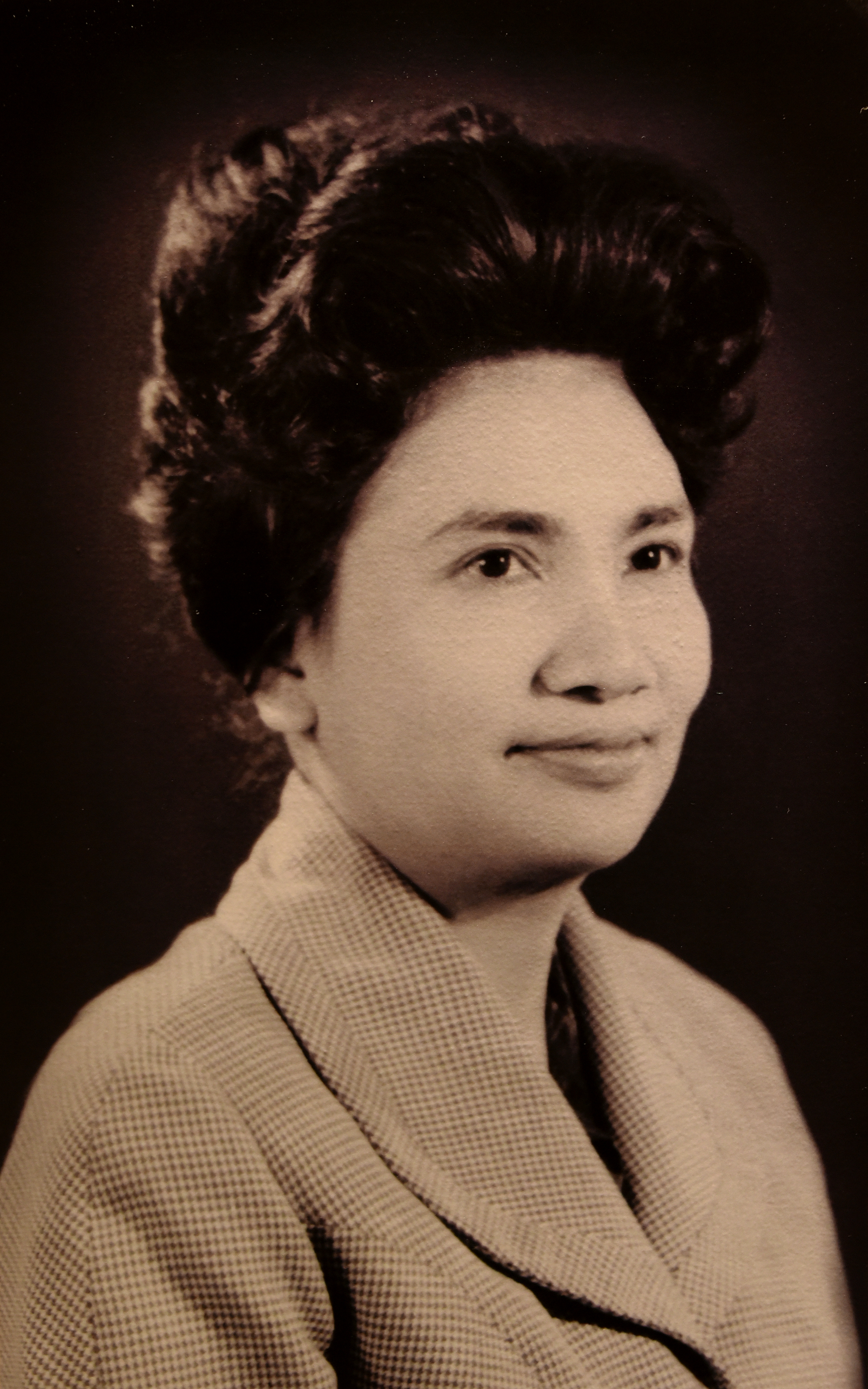
Tuanku Najihah binti Tunku Besar Burhanuddin. The Tuanku Ja'afar Royal Gallery, Seremban

== Social contributions ==
Tuanku Najihah was made a committee member of the Associated Country Women of the World. She was the patron of various women's organizations such as the Girl Guides of Negeri Sembilan, the Islamic Women's Welfare Council and the Women's Institute.

She was also the president of the Tuanku Ampuan Badminton Team, the Patron of the Malaysian Women's Hockey Team, Malaysian Women's Football Team, Malaysian Women's Golf Team and the Malaysian Women's Golf Association (MALGA).

She also served as the first Chancellor of Universiti Sains Islam Malaysia.

== Family life ==
The royal couple had three sons and three daughters :

- Tunku Tan Sri Naquiah, the Tunku Dara of Negeri Sembilan (born 26 December 1944)
- Tunku Dato' Seri Utama Naquiyuddin, the Tunku Laksamana of Negeri Sembilan (born 8 March 1947)
- Tunku Tan Sri Dato' Seri Imran, the Tunku Muda Serting of Negeri Sembilan (born 21 March 1949)
- Tunku Puan Sri Jawahir, the Tunku Puteri of Negeri Sembilan (born 27 January 1952)
- Tunku Dato' Seri Irinah, the Tengku Puan Panglima Raja of Selangor (born 23 November 1957)
- Tunku Dato' Seri Nadzaruddin (born 26 October 1959)

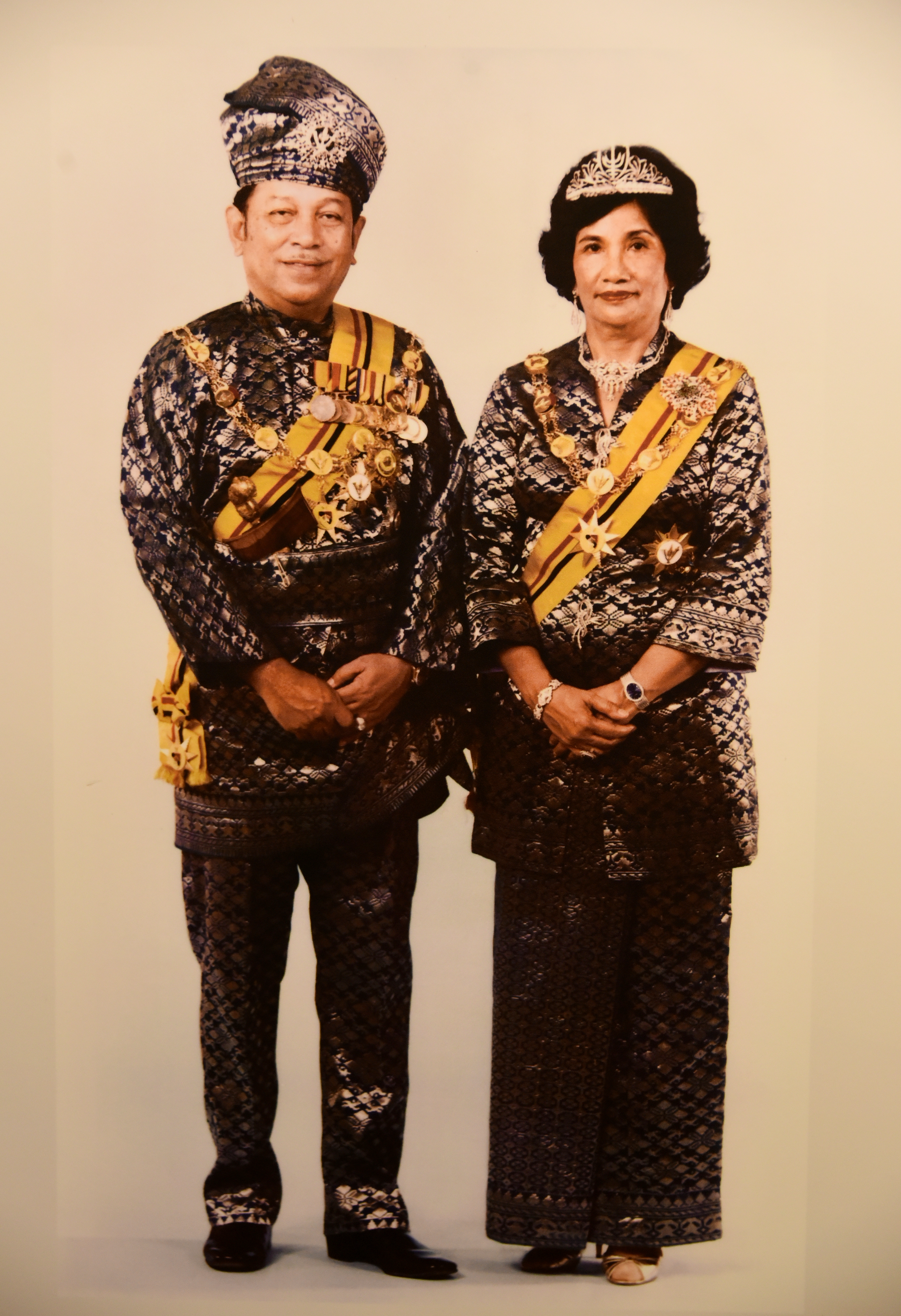
Tuanku Ja'afar ibni Almarhum Tuanku Abdul Rahman with his wife Tuanku Najihah binti Tunku Besar Burhanuddin. The Tuanku Ja'afar Royal Gallery, Seremban

== Death ==
Tuanku Najihah died at the Cardiac Vascular Central Hospital in Kuala Lumpur, Malaysia on 8 September 2023, one week after celebrating her 100th birthday. Her remains were laid to rest at Seri Menanti Royal Mausoleum and buried next to her husband Almarhum Tuanku Ja'afar, who died in 2008.

== Awards and recognitions ==
=== Honours of Negeri Sembilan ===
- Member of the Royal Family Order of Negeri Sembilan (DKNS)
- Knight Grand Commander of the Grand Order of Tuanku Ja'afar (SPTJ) – Dato' Seri

=== Honours of Malaysia ===
- Malaysia, as Raja Permaisuri Agong of Malaysia (26 April 1994 to 25 April 1999), she was awarded
  - Recipient of the Order of the Crown of the Realm (DMN)
- Kedah
  - Member of the Royal Family Order of Kedah (DK)
- Kelantan
  - Recipient of the Royal Family Order of Kelantan (DK)
  - Knight Grand Commander of the Order of the Crown of Kelantan (SPMK) – Dato' (1992)

=== Foreign honours ===
- Spain
  - Dame Grand Cross of the Order of Civil Merit (24 March 1995)

=== Places named after her ===
Several places were named after her, including:

- Tuanku Ampuan Najihah Hospital in Kuala Pilah, Negeri Sembilan
- Kompleks Sukan Tunku Najihah, Universiti Sains Islam Malaysia, Nilai, Negeri Sembilan
- SMK Tunku Ampuan Najihah, a secondary school in Seremban, Negeri Sembilan
- Taman Sinar Harapan Tuanku Ampuan Najihah in Seremban, Negeri Sembilan
- Taman Tuanku Ampuan Najihah, a residential area in Seremban, Negeri Sembilan

== See also ==
- Yang Di-Pertuan Agong
- Raja Permaisuri Agong

== Sources ==
- "Syarikat Pesaka Antah Sdn Bhd" Website, presentation of the Board of Directors with photo of Tuanku Najihah

Malaysian royalty
Preceded by Tuanku Bainun (Raja Permaisuri of Perak)	Raja Permaisuri Agong (Queen of Malaysia)	Succeeded by Tuanku Siti Aishah (Tengku Permaisuri of Selangor)
