= Ja'afar of Negeri Sembilan =

King of Malaysia from 1994 to 1999

Ja'afar: جعفر
- Yang di-Pertuan Besar of Negeri Sembilan
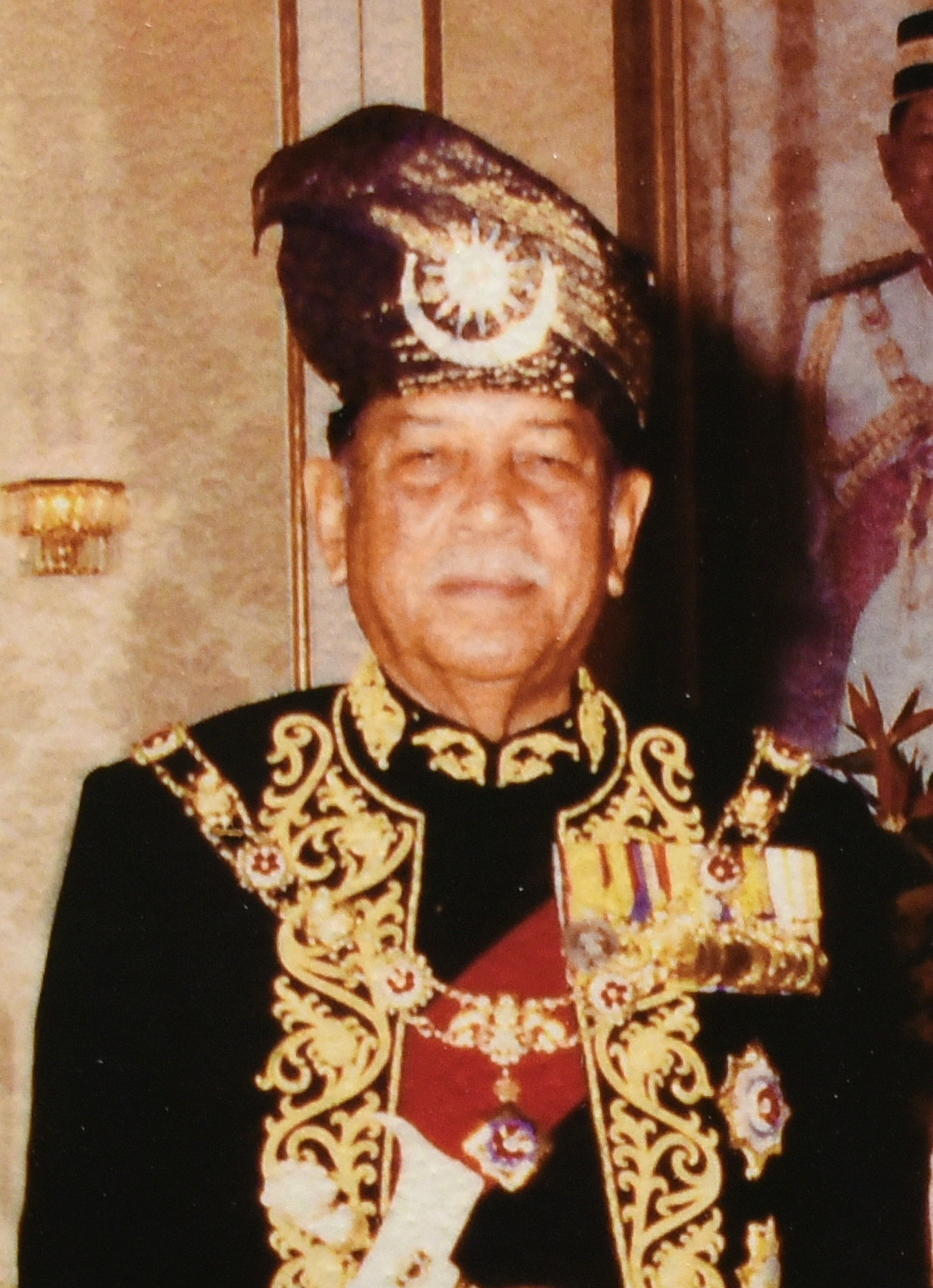

King of Malaysia
- Reign: 26 April 1994 – 25 April 1999
- Installation: 22 September 1994
- Predecessor: Azlan Shah
- Successor: Salahuddin

Yang di-Pertuan Besar of Negeri Sembilan
- Reign: 18 April 1967 – 27 December 2008
- Installation: 8 April 1968
- Predecessor: Tuanku Munawir
- Successor: Tuanku Muhriz

Tunku Muda Serting of Negeri Sembilan
- Tenure: 1937–1967
- Predecessor: Tuanku Munawir

2nd Chancellor National University of Malaysia
- Tenure: 16 April 1976 – 2008
- Predecessor: Tun Abdul Razak
- Successor: Tuanku Muhriz
- Born: 19 July 1922; Klang, Selangor, Federated Malay States
- Died: 27 December 2008 (aged 86); Seremban, Negeri Sembilan, Malaysia
- Burial: 29 December 2008; Seri Menanti Royal Mausoleum, Seri Menanti, Negeri Sembilan, Malaysia
- Spouse: Tuanku Najihah (m. 1942–2008)
- Issue: Tunku Naquiah; Tunku Naquiyuddin; Tunku Imran; Tunku Jawahir; Tunku Irinah; Tunku Nadzaruddin
Names
- Tunku Ja'afar ibni Tunku Abdul Rahman
Regnal name
- Tuanku Ja'afar ibni Almarhum Tuanku Abdul Rahman
- House: Pagaruyung - House of Yamtuan Raden
- Father: Tuanku Abdul Rahman Ibni Almarhum Tuanku Muhammad
- Mother: Che Engku Maimunah Binti Abdullah
- Religion: Sunni Islam

Ja'afar ibni Almarhum Tuanku Abdul Rahman GCB (Jawi: توانكو جعفر ابن المرحوم توانكو عبدالرحمن; 19 July 1922 – 27 December 2008) was the Yang di-Pertuan Besar of Negeri Sembilan from 1967 until his death in 2008, and the tenth Yang di-Pertuan Agong (King of Malaysia), from 1994 to 1999.

== Early life and education ==
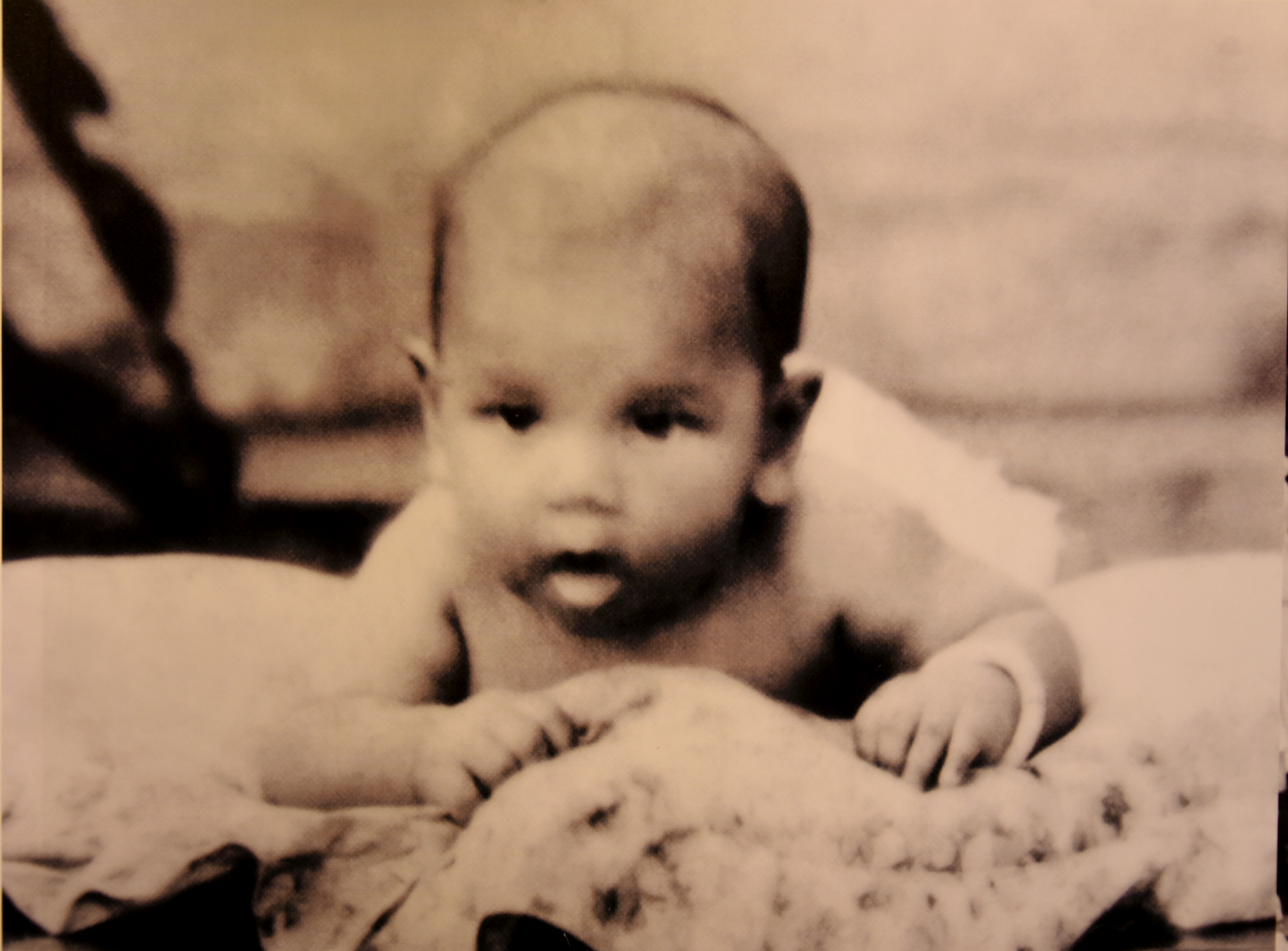
Tuanku Jaafar ibni Almarhum Tuanku Abdul Rahman at the age of 6 months, January 1923.

Tuanku Ja'afar ibni Almarhum Tuanku Abdul Rahman was born on 19 July 1922 in Klang, Selangor to Tuanku Abdul Rahman ibni Almarhum Tuanku Muhammad and his wife Che Engku Maimunah binti Abdullah and was raised in Seri Menanti, Negeri Sembilan. His mother was of mixed Irish and Anglo-Indian descent.

Growing up in an affectionate and considerate family had a profound impact on Tuanku Ja'afar's character. He had a very close relationship with his siblings. He also emulated his father's practice of visiting the local villagers and performing Friday prayers at Masjid Seri Menanti with his subjects. This childhood experience helped form Tuanku Ja'afar as an approachable and highly respected individual. Tuanku Ja'afar received his primary education at the Seri Menanti Malay School. Tuanku Ja'afar then continued his studies at the Malay College Kuala Kangsar (MCKK). Sports were a compulsory subject at MCKK. Tuanku Ja'afar was good at several sports and was made the captain of the cricket, tennis, squash, football and hockey teams. On top of that, Tuanku Ja'afar was also a skilled badminton and chess player. It was at MCKK that he became close with Abdul Razak Hussein, who would become the second prime minister of Malaysia.

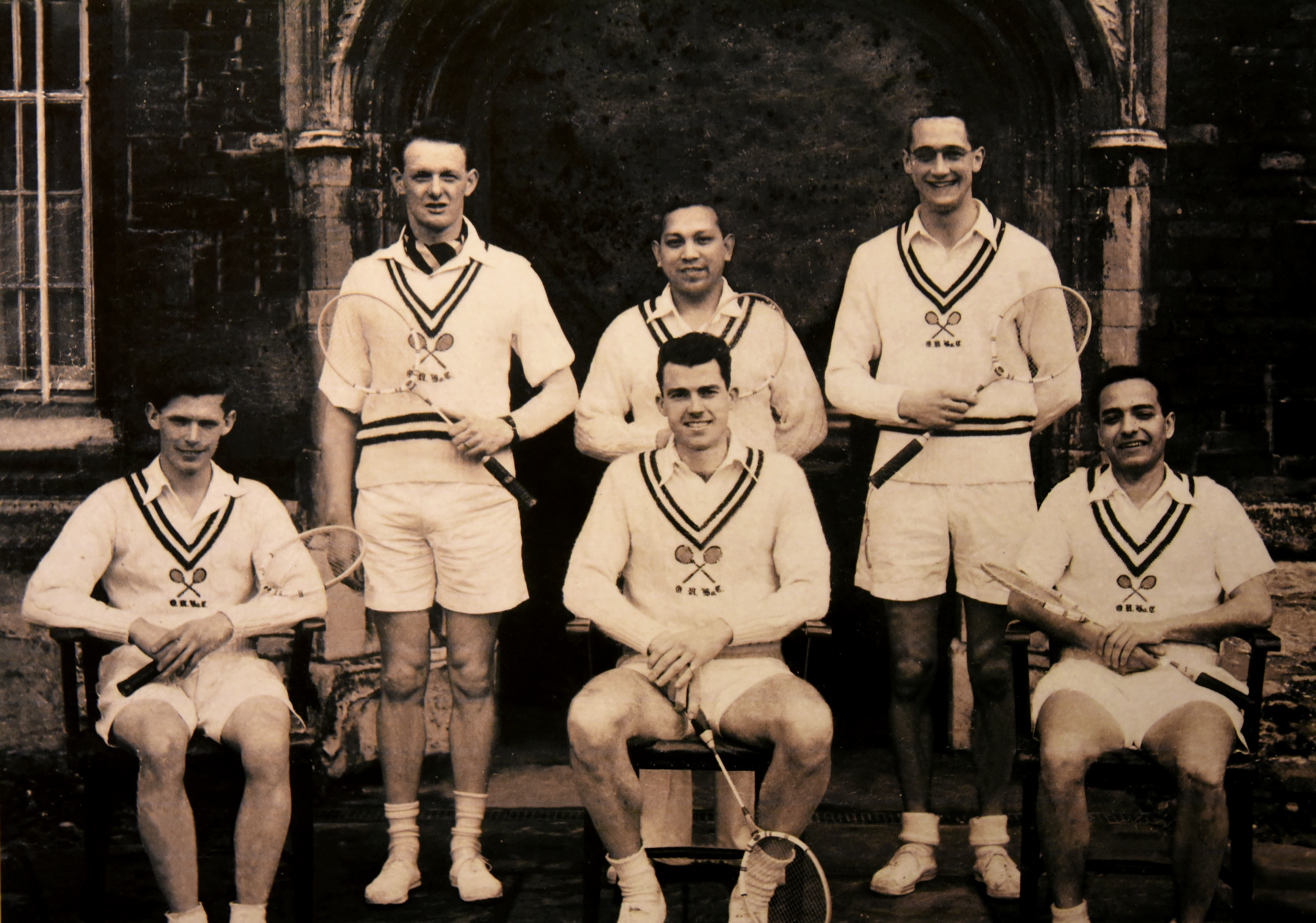
Tunaku Ja'afar along with Badminton Association at the University of Nottingham.

In 1940, after graduating from MCKK, Tuanku Ja'afar furthered his studies at Raffles College, Singapore. At the time, Raffles College was a popular higher education institution in Southeast Asia. Tuanku Ja'afar had favoured sports over studies. As a keen tennis player, he would always play with Lee Kuan Yew, who became the first prime minister of Singapore. Tuanku Ja'afar, who was supposed to complete the three-year programme, had to return to Malaya due to the start of World War II in December 1941.

== Early career ==
=== State Officer ===
During the Japanese occupation of Malaya, he worked at the Seremban Land Office, Rembau and also Kuala Lumpur. Then, in the late 1940s, he was transferred to the Perak State Secretariat in Ipoh and was in charge of processing citizenship applications.

In 1946, Tuanku Ja'afar started working in the Malay Administrative Service. Later in 1947, Tuanku Ja'afar was promoted to the position of Tax Assistant in Rembau, Negeri Sembilan. Tuanku Ja'afar was then promoted as the District Officer in Tampin, Negeri Sembilan until 1955 and supported an anti-communist campaign. At this time he was also the chairman of the Tampin District War Committee. At this time he decided that he wanted to further his studies in law.

He spent four years at University of Nottingham and graduated with a Bachelor of Laws in 1947 before attending Balliol College, Oxford and the London School of Economics. This decision was driven by his interest in the subject of humanitarian, social and economic sciences. Tuanku Ja'afar was accompanied by Tuanku Najihah and their children. While at university, he continued playing cricket, football and badminton. He was also made captain of the tennis club and badminton.

Upon his return from the United Kingdom in 1952, Tuanku Ja'afar held several posts in the civil service of the Malaysia including Assistant State Secretary of Perak, Assistant District Officer of Parit, Perak, and District Officer of Tampin.

=== Diplomat ===
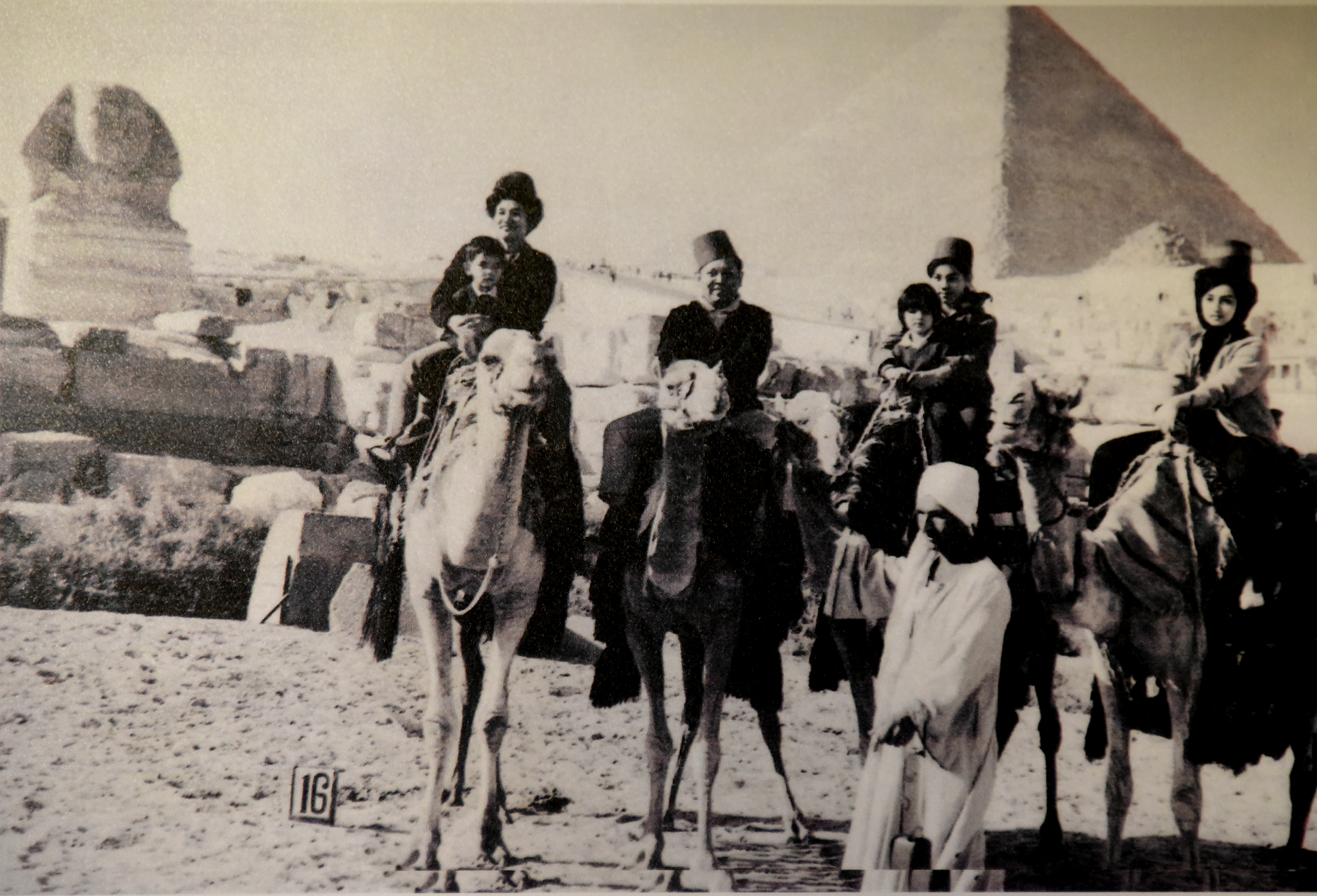
Tuanku Ja'afar with family while in Egypt, the United Arab Republic in 1963, when he served as ambassador to Cairo, Egypt.

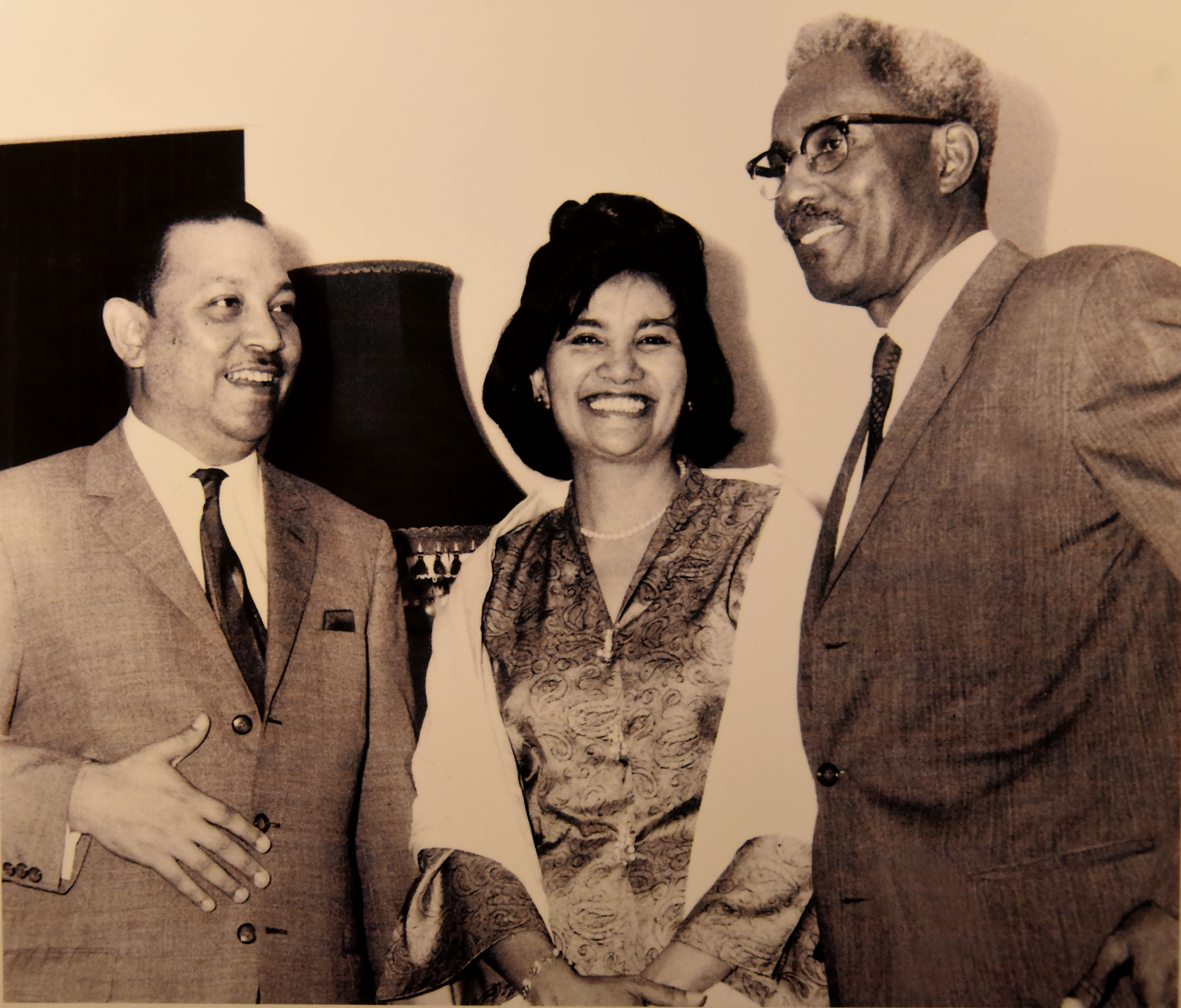
Tuanku Ja'afar and his wife Tuanku Najihah in an event at their home in Lagos, Nigeria in 1965, when he served as an Ambassador.

Tuanku Ja'afar's diplomatic career began in 1957. Tuanku Ja'afar was chosen to attend a one-year Diplomatic Service Course in London. While in London, the independence entourage led by Tunku Abdul Rahman arrived. Their purpose was to negotiate with the officers from the British Colonial Office at Lancaster House, London to obtain independence. Tuanku Ja'afar assisted with the logistics, proposal papers and presentations. The entourage succeeded in achieving its goal when the British eventually consented to give independence to the Federation of Malaya. This news was greeted with great joy and an official ceremony was then held at the Dataran Merdeka, Kuala Lumpur on 31 August 1957. His first appointment was as chargé d'affaires in Embassy of Malaysia, Washington, D.C., followed by first secretary with the Permanent Mission to the United Nations in New York, consular and deputy high commissioner at the High Commission of Malaysia, London. Tuanku Ja'afar was later appointed as the Malaysian ambassador to Egypt and then as high commissioner to Nigeria and Ghana.

== 42 years as the 10th Yang di-Pertuan Besar of Negeri Sembilan ==
Tuanku Ja'afar was to leave for Japan to serve as the Malaysian ambassador to Japan but was recalled by the State Government of Negeri Sembilan in 1967 following the death of his half brother Tuanku Munawir who had been the Yang di-Pertuan Besar.

In line with the royal customs of Negeri Sembilan, before proceeding with the burial ceremony of Tuanku Munawir, a new ruler had to be selected to succeed the late Yang di-Pertuan Besar. As such the four Undang (Ruling Chiefs of Negeri Sembilan) conferred to choose the late Tuanku Munawir's successor.

The selection of Tuanku Munawir's successor had to be made from four eligible princes, or Putera Yang Empat, in order:

1. Tunku Besar Seri Menanti, Tunku Muhriz ibni Almarhum Tuanku Munawir
2. Tunku Laksamana, Tunku Nasir Alam ibni Almarhum Tuanku Muhammad
3. Tunku Muda Serting, Tunku Ja'afar ibni Almarhum Tuanku Abdul Rahman
4. Tunku Panglima Besar, Tunku Abdullah ibni Almarhum Tuanku Abdul Rahman

The Undang Yang Empat unanimously decided on Tuanku Ja'afar, who was 44 years old at the time, to accede to the throne as the 10th Yang di-Pertuan Besar of Negeri Sembilan. This proclamation was made by Dato' Undang Luak Jelebu, Dato' Abu Bakar bin Ma'amor, at Balairung Seri Istana Besar Seri Menanti. Tuanku Ja'afar ascended the throne as the 10th Ruler of Negeri Sembilan on 18 April 1967.

== 10th Yang di-Pertuan Agong of Malaysia ==
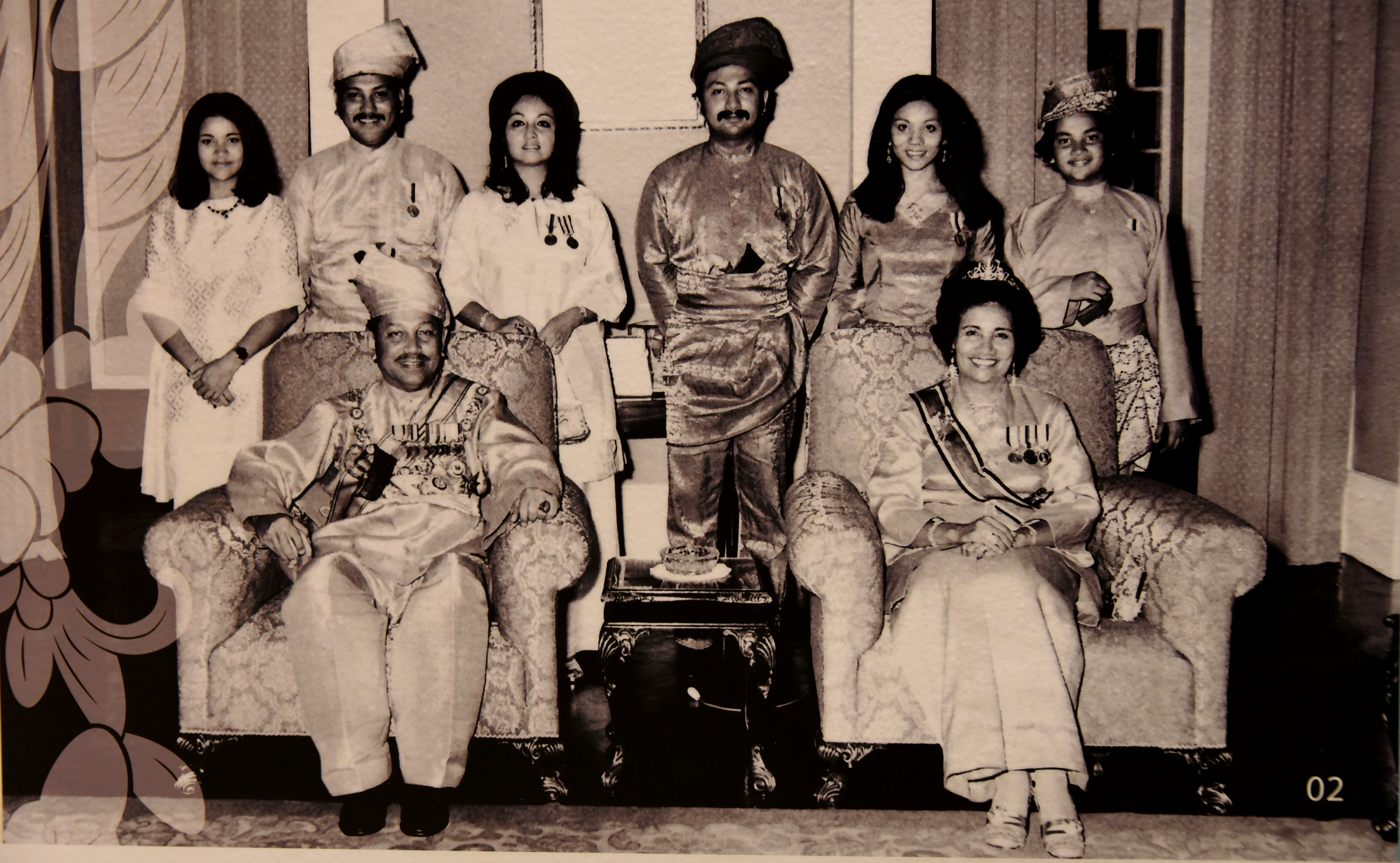
Photo of the royal family after Tuanku Ja'afar was installed as the 10th Yang di-Pertuan Besar of Negeri Sembilan in 1968.

Tuanku Ja'afar was the tenth Yang di-Pertuan Agong of Malaysia from 26 April 1994 until 25 April 1999 succeeding Sultan Azlan Shah of Perak. On 26 April 1994, two months after he was chosen as the 10th Yang di-Pertuan Agong, Tuanku Ja'afar left the Istana Besar Seri Menanti, Negeri Sembilan, for the Istana Negara, Kuala Lumpur for the Installation Ceremony held at Balairung Seri Istana Negara. This auspicious event was witnessed by all Malay Rulers or their representatives. As the Yang di-Pertuan Agong, Tuanku Ja'afar played a significant role in fostering ties between Malaysia and other countries.

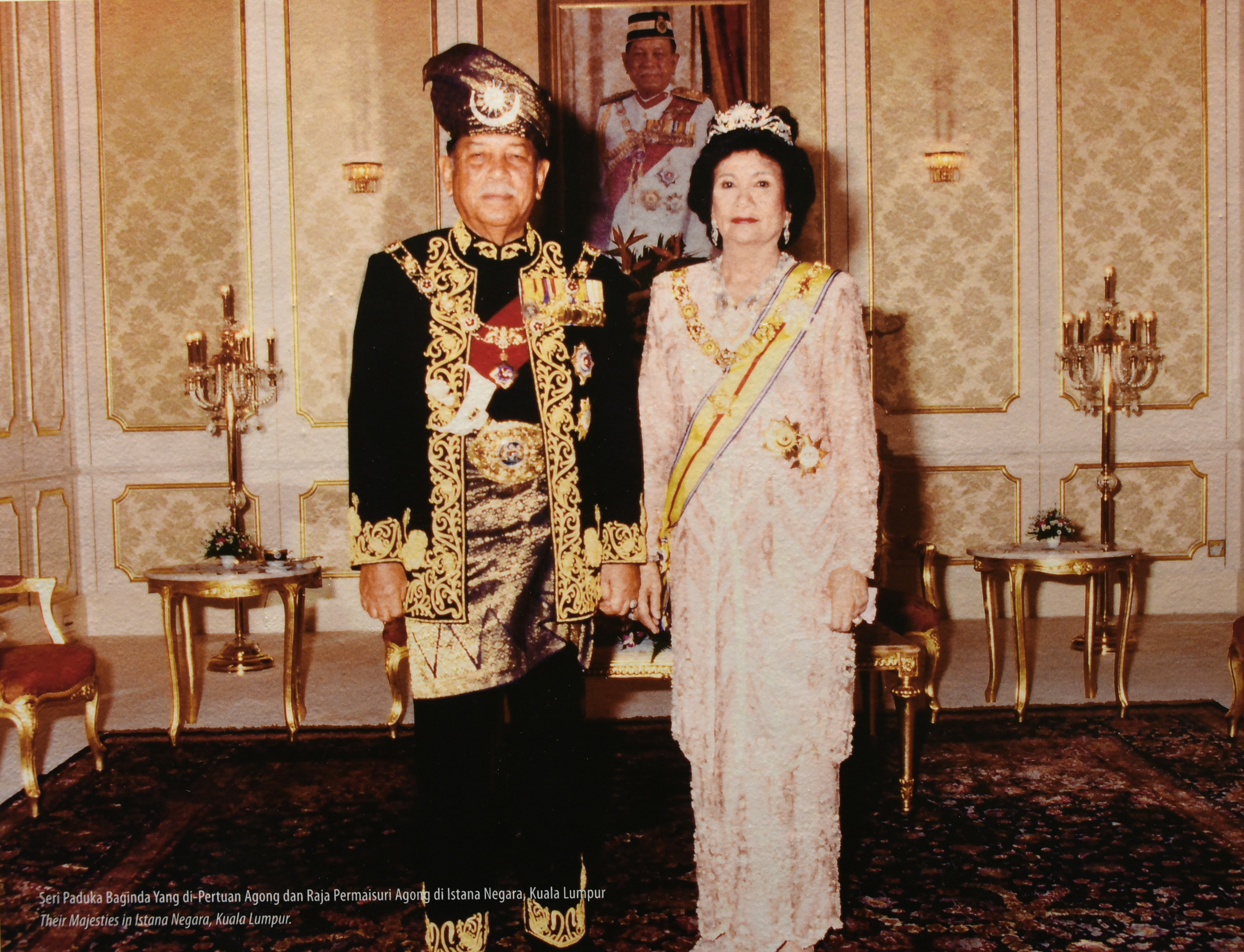
Tuanku Ja'afar Yang di-Pertuan Agong of Malaysia and his wife Tuanku Najiha Raja Permaisuri Agong of Malaysia.

Malaysia achieved many milestones while he was the Yang di-Pertuan Agong, among them Malaysia's successful hosting of the 16th Commonwealth Games and APEC Summit, both in 1998. He also worked on Kuala Lumpur International Airport (KLIA) in Sepang, the Petronas Twin Towers, the Multimedia Super Corridor (MSC) and the new administrative capital of Putrajaya.

== Issue ==
Tuanku Ja'afar married Tuanku Najihah binti Almarhum Tunku Besar Burhanuddin of Negeri Sembilan in 1942, who also served as his Raja Permaisuri Agong between 1994 and 1999. They had issue, 3 sons and 3 daughters:

- Tunku Dara of Negeri Sembilan, Tunku Tan Sri Naquiah (born on 26 December 1944)
- Tunku Laksamana of Negeri Sembilan, Tunku Dato' Seri Utama Naquiyuddin (born on 8 March 1947)
- Tunku Muda Serting of Negeri Sembilan, Tunku Tan Sri Dato' Seri Imran (born on 21 March 1949)
- Tunku Puteri of Negeri Sembilan, Tunku Puan Sri Dato' Seri Jawahir (born on 27 January 1952)
- Tengku Puan Panglima Raja of Selangor, Tunku Dato' Seri Irinah (born on 23 November 1957)
- Tunku Dato' Seri Nadzaruddin (born on 26 October 1959)

== Contributions ==
During his reign as the ruler of Negeri Sembilan, Tuanku Ja'afar focused his attention on the problems of the people and the administration of the state. In handling the socio-economic affairs of the state, Tuanku Ja'afar directed his attention to the industry and public housing sectors so as to improve the living standard of the people. As a result, several new housing areas were developed among which is Taman Tuanku Ja'afar which includes an industrial area and a golf course of international standard, Taman Tuanku Ampuan Najihah in Sungai Gadut and the Mambau housing project. The construction of these housing areas improved the people's chances of owning their own property. This enabled them to enjoy a better standard of comfort. The expansion of the industrial sector paved way for more job opportunities for his subjects, thus improving their standard of living and also eradicating poverty amongst the people of Negeri Sembilan. He also endorsed the setting up of various recreational facilities to encourage families to spend time outdoors.

=== Education ===
Tuanku Ja'afar became the second chancellor of the National University of Malaysia (UKM) on 16 April 1976. Tuanku Ja'afar had always urged for the improvement of the standard of education in Malaysia. He was awarded Honorary Doctorate of Law by several universities namely the University of the Philippines (27 July 1990), University of Nottingham (21 July 1995), University of Santiago, Chile (28 September 1995) and University of Brunei Darussalam (11 September 1996).

During Tuanku Ja'afar's chancellorship, UKM achieved significant milestones such as:

- The appointment as a research university.
- The establishment of Malaysia Genome Institute and Institute of Global Health, United Nations University.
- Listed in the Times Higher Education Supplement (THES) and secured the highest position in 2006 compared to other universities in Malaysia.
- Recipient of the Prime Minister's Award in 2006.

== Hobbies ==
Tuanku Ja'afar had a passion for sports, especially golf and cricket. He was a painter.

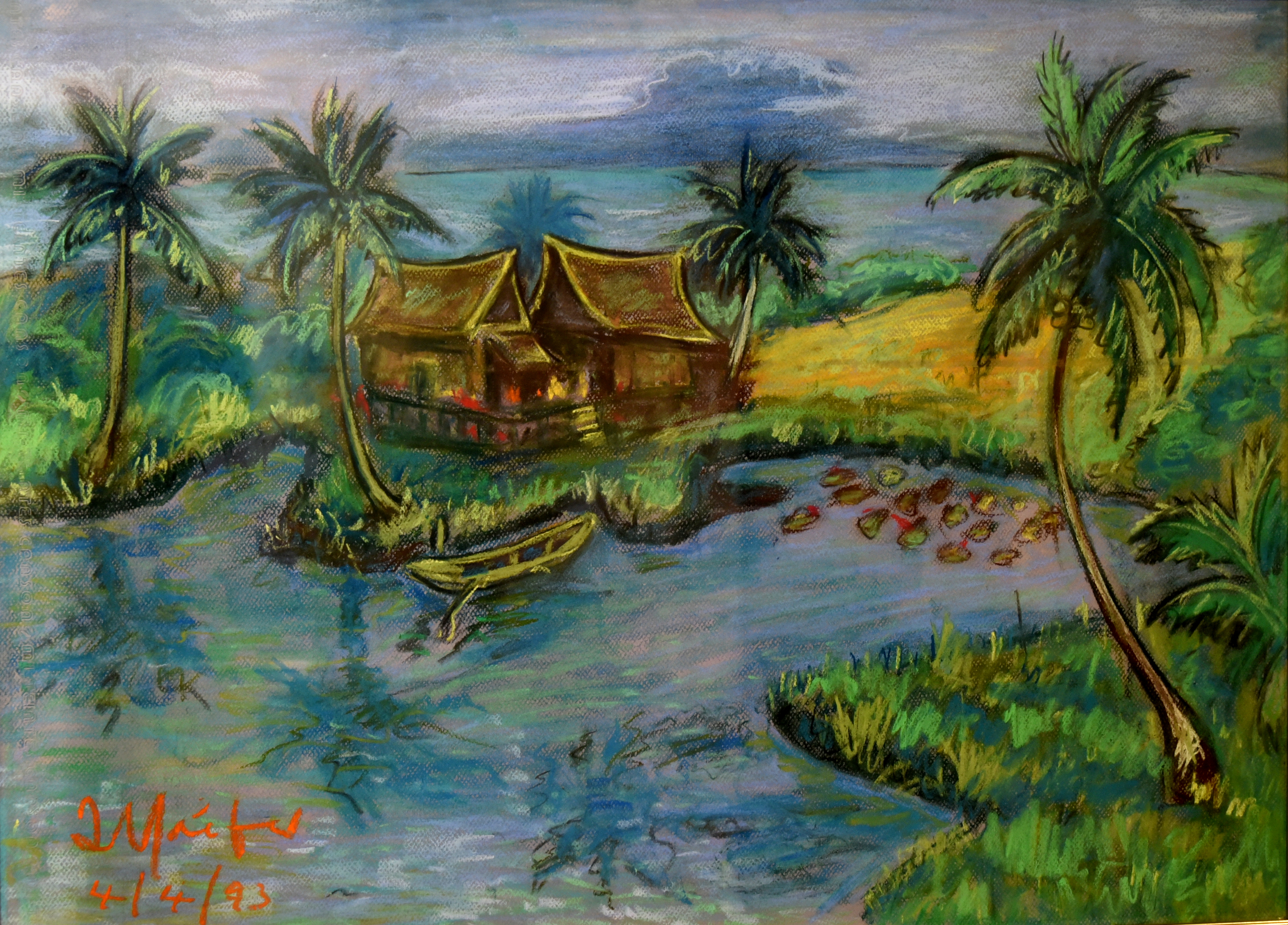
A calm and tranquil village scenery, drawn on 4 April 1993 by Tuanku Ja'afar.

== Death ==
Tuanku Ja'afar died on 27 December 2008 at Hospital Tuanku Ja'afar, Seremban from a stroke. He was 86 years old. His younger brother, Tunku Panglima Besar Tunku Tan Sri Abdullah had died four months earlier. Before Tuanku Ja'afar's death, he was admitted to the hospital after feeling dizzy. He was buried at the Seri Menanti Royal Mausoleum at Seri Menanti on 29 December 2008. Notably, his funeral was attended by Sultan Hassanal Bolkiah and Prince Mohamed Bolkiah.

== Honours ==
=== Colonel-in-chief of the Royal Signals Regiment ===
The Royal Signals Regiment (RSD) is a combat support regiment in the Malaysian Army. Its main role is to establish and secure communication facilities for the command and tactical elements of the Malaysian Army. This Regiment is also involved in providing electronic warfare support and securing all communication channels amongst formation quarters and tactical teams. As the Colonel-in-Chief for RSD, Tuanku Ja'afar ibni Almarhum Tuanku Abdul Rahman often participated in RSD-organised programs such as visits to military camps, sporting events such as the shooting competitions frequently held at shooting ranges.

=== Colonel-in-Chief of the Royal Electrical and Mechanical Engineers Corps ===
Tuanku Ja’afar, the Colonel-in-Chief of the Royal Electrical and Mechanical Engineers Corps (KJLJD) stated that the corps was formed by the result of the work performed by its past and present members, and that the group's history included significant challenges. He honored the members of the corps who died during their service. He also expressed a goal for the organization to be successful in both Malaysia and other countries. The initial role of Royal Electrical and Mechanical Engineers Corps is to provide technical support such as the maintenance of many military equipment owned by the Malaysian Army. The corps have now expanded to accommodate many more services.

=== Royal Malaysian Air Force ===
Tuanku Ja'afar also held the rank of Marshal of the Royal Malaysian Air Force.

=== Honours of Negeri Sembilan ===
As Yang di-Pertuan Besar of Negeri Sembilan (8 April 1967 – 27 December 2008), he was:

- Founding Grand Master and Member of the Royal Family Order of Negeri Sembilan (DKNS, 24 May 1979 – 27 December 2008)
- Founding Grand Master of the Order of Negeri Sembilan (24 May 1979 – 27 December 2008)
- Founding Grand Master of the Royal Family Order of Yam Tuan Radin Sunnah (24 May 1979 – 27 December 2008)
- Founding Grand Master of the Order of Loyalty to Negeri Sembilan (24 May 1979 – 27 December 2008)
- Founding Grand Master of the Grand Order of Tuanku Ja'afar (Negeri Sembilan) (18 July 1984 – 27 December 2008)

=== Honours of Malaysia ===
- Malaysia (as Yang di-Pertuan Agong of Malaysia from 26 April 1994 to 25 April 1999)
  - Recipient & Grand Master of Order of the Royal Family of Malaysia (DKM, 27 May 1994)
  - Grand Master of the Order of the Crown of the Realm (earlier recipient 3 April 1968)
  - Grand Master of the Order of the Defender of the Realm (earlier Grand Commander)
  - Grand Master of the Order of Loyalty to the Crown of Malaysia
  - Grand Master of the Order of Merit
  - Founding Grand Master of the Order of Meritorious Service (2 May 1995 – 21 November 2001)
  - Grand Master of the Order of Loyalty to the Royal Family of Malaysia
- Johor
  - First Class of the Royal Family Order of Johor (DK I)
- Kedah
  - Member of the Royal Family Order of Kedah (DK) (1982)
- Kelantan
  - Recipient of the Royal Family Order of Kelantan or Star of Yunus (DK)
- Pahang
  - Member 1st class of the Family Order of the Crown of Indra of Pahang (DK I) (1987)
- Perak
  - Recipient of the Royal Family Order of Perak (DK) (1988)
- Perlis
  - Recipient of the Perlis Family Order of the Gallant Prince Syed Putra Jamalullail (DK)
- Selangor
  - First Class of the Royal Family Order of Selangor (DK I) (1982)
- Terengganu
  - Member first class of the Family Order of Terengganu (DK I)

=== Foreign honours ===
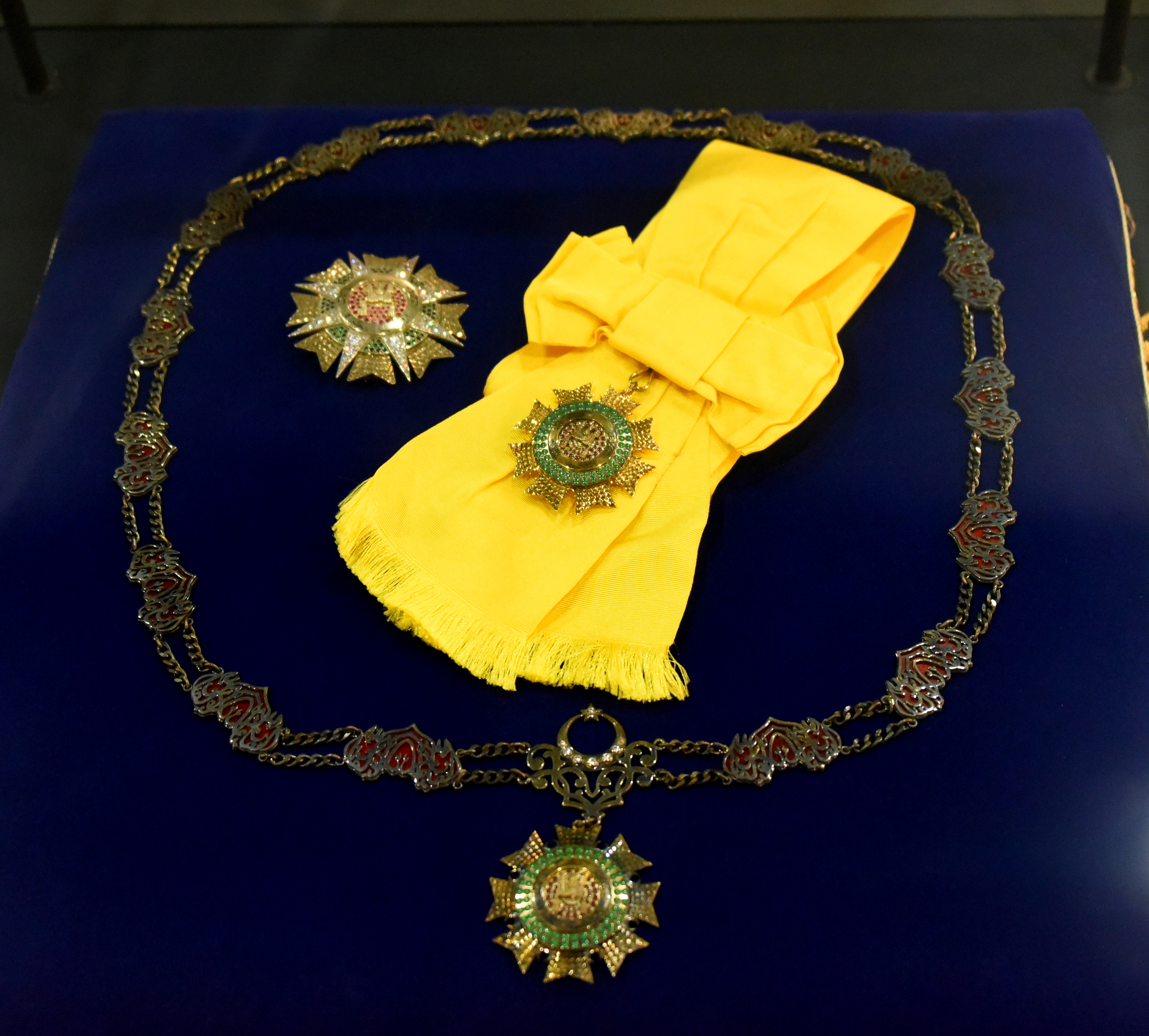
Royal Family Order of the Crown of Brunei. Awarded Honour to Tuanku Ja'afar in 1996.

He received many foreign awards during his years of royal service. These are:

- Brazil
  - Grand Collar of the Order of the Southern Cross (22 February 1996)
- Brunei
  - Royal Family Order of the Crown of Brunei (DKMB) (10 September 1996)
  - Senior of the Family Order of Brunei (DK) (5 August 1968)
- Cambodia
  - Grand Collar of the Order of Independence of Cambodia
- Chile
  - Grand Collar of the Order of Merit (Chile) (27 September 1995)
- Djibouti
  - Grand Star of Djibouti
- Finland
  - Grand Cross with Collar of the Order of the White Rose of Finland (25 January 1995)
- Germany
  - Grand Cross Special Class of the Order of Merit of the Federal Republic of Germany (1 April 1997)
- Peru
  - Grand Cross with Diamonds the Order of the Sun of Peru
- Philippines
  - Grand Collar of the Order of Sikatuna, Rank of Raja (21 June 1995)
- South Korea
  - Grand Order of Mugunghwa
- Spain
  - Collar of the Order of Civil Merit (24 March 1995)
- Sweden
  - Knight with Collar of the Order of the Seraphim (22 February 1996)
- Uruguay
  - Medal of the Oriental Republic of Uruguay (3.7.1996)
- United Kingdom
  - Knight Grand Cross of the Order of the Bath (GCB) (14 October 1998)

== Tuanku Ja'afar Royal Gallery ==
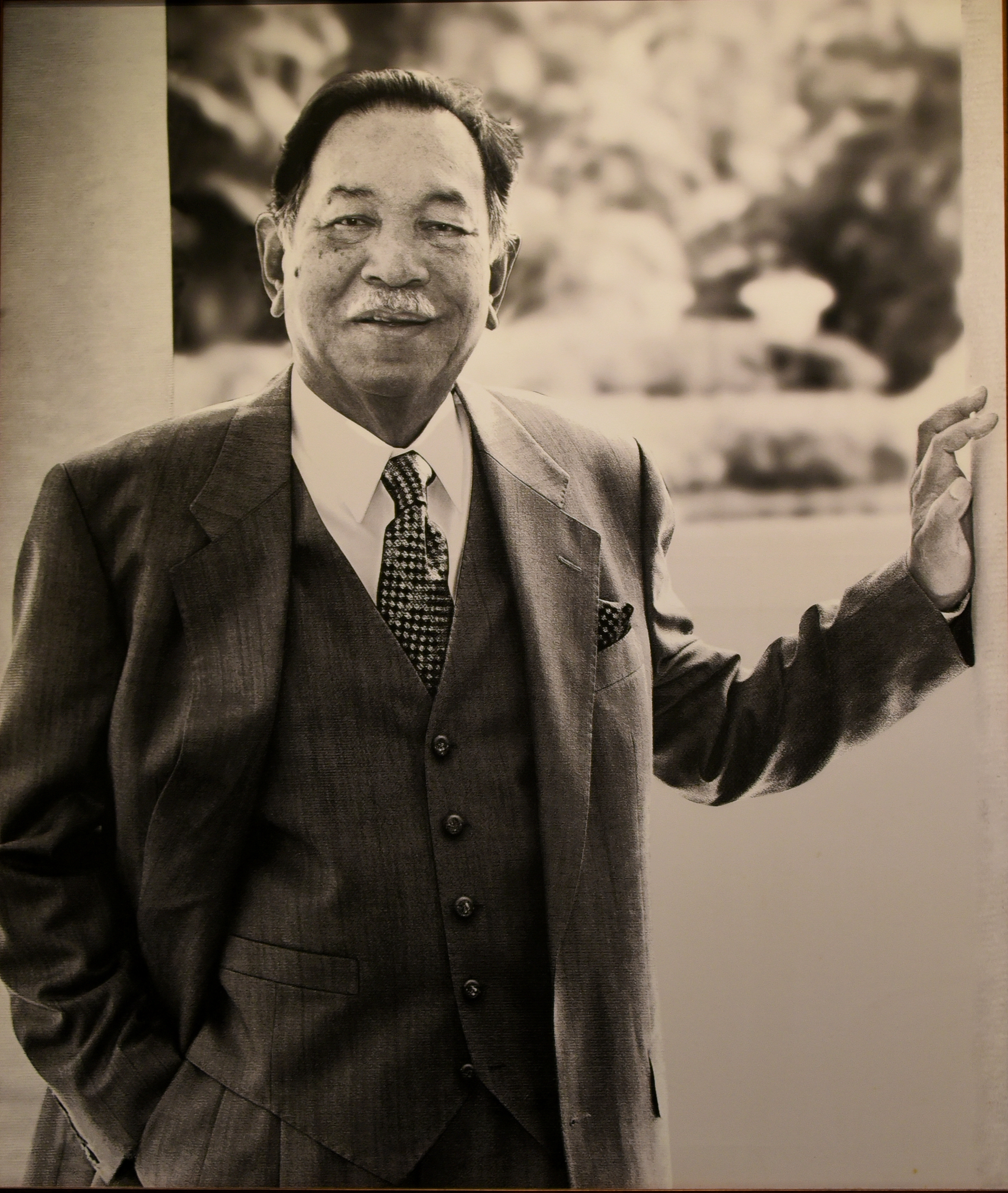
Tuanku Ja'afar ibni Almarhum Tuanku Abdul Rahman, 19 July 1922 – 27 December 2008.

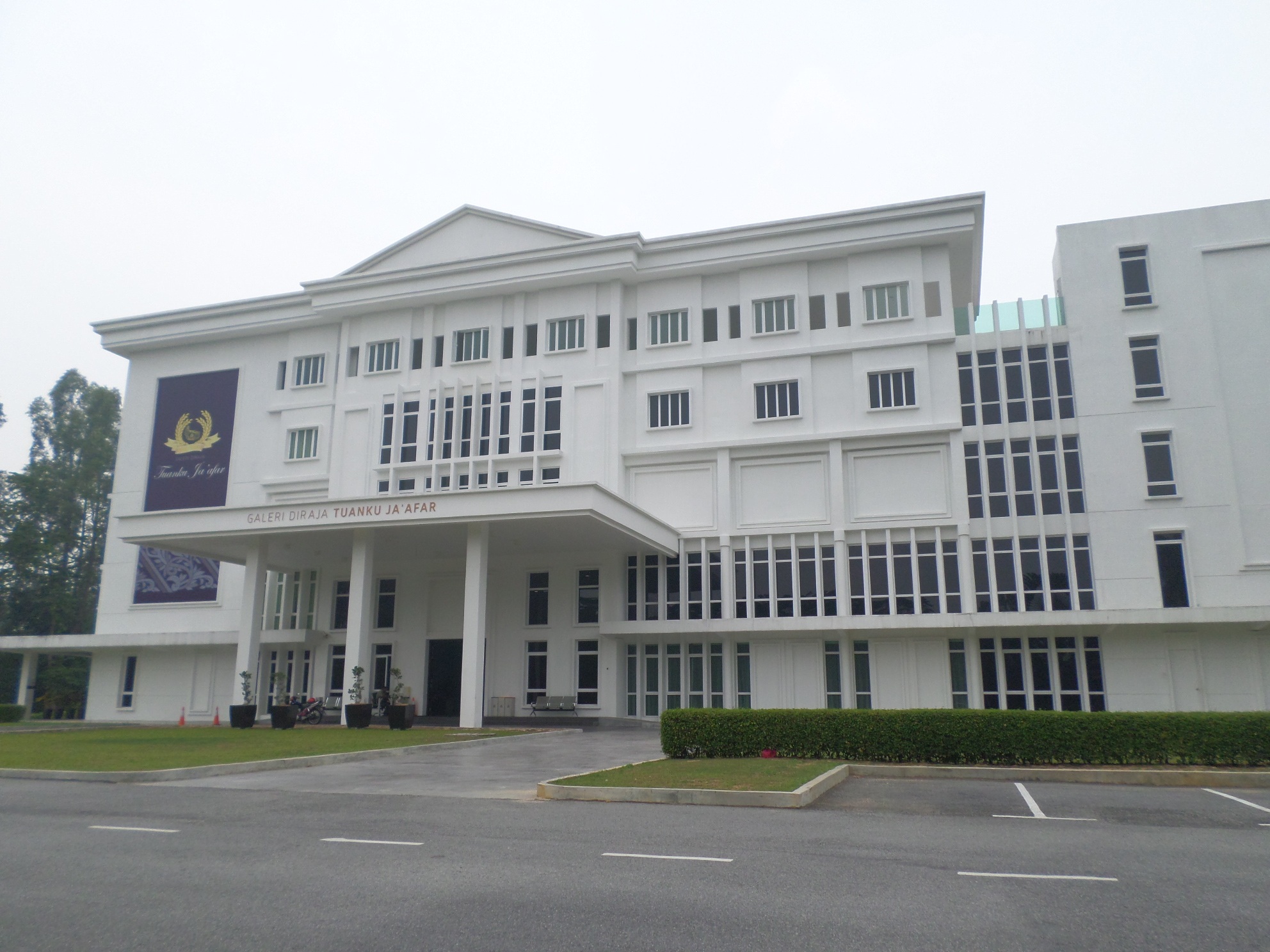
Tuanku Ja'afar Royal Gallery

The Tuanku Ja'afar Royal Gallery located nearby to Taman Tasik Seremban, is a building with an area of approximately 44,000 square feet that houses a gallery which was developed to revive the memories of Tuanku Ja'afar ibni Almarhum Tuanku Abdul Rahman. The Gallery was the brainchild of the Late ruler who wanted to build a gallery that portrayed the uniqueness of Negeri Sembilan's roots, the past royal rulers of Negeri Sembilan and his life journey. The Royal exhibition highlighted the exclusivity of the concept of 'Biographical Journey of Tuanku Ja'afar' with eight consecutive exhibition chambers.

== Recognition ==
Many places and landmarks were named after him. These are:

- Tuanku Ja'afar Power Station, Port Dickson, Negeri Sembilan
- Sekolah Menengah Sains Tuanku Ja'afar, Kuala Pilah, Negeri Sembilan
- Kolej Tuanku Ja'afar, Mantin, Negeri Sembilan
- Tuanku Ja'afar Hospital, Seremban, Negeri Sembilan
- Tuanku Ja'afar Royal Gallery, Seremban, Negeri Sembilan
- Sekolah Menengah Teknik Tuanku Jaafar (STTJ), Ampangan, Seremban, Negeri Sembilan
- Tuanku Ja'afar Cup
- Taman Tuanku Ja'afar, a residential area in Seremban, Negeri Sembilan
- SMK Taman Tuanku Ja'afar, a secondary school in Seremban, Negeri Sembilan
- Taman Tuanku Ja'afar Mosque in Seremban, Negeri Sembilan

== Bibliography ==
- Halim, Tunku Abdullah: A Passion for Life, All-Media Publications, 1998, ISBN 983-99449-0-8

Regnal titles
Preceded by Sultan Azlan Shah (Sultan of Perak)	Yang di-Pertuan Agong (King of Malaysia); 1994–1999	Succeeded by Sultan Salahuddin (Sultan of Selangor)
Preceded by Tuanku Munawir	Yang di-Pertuan Besar of Negeri Sembilan; 1967–2008	Succeeded by Tuanku Muhriz
