= Tunku Imran =

Negeri Sembilanian Royal and Olympian

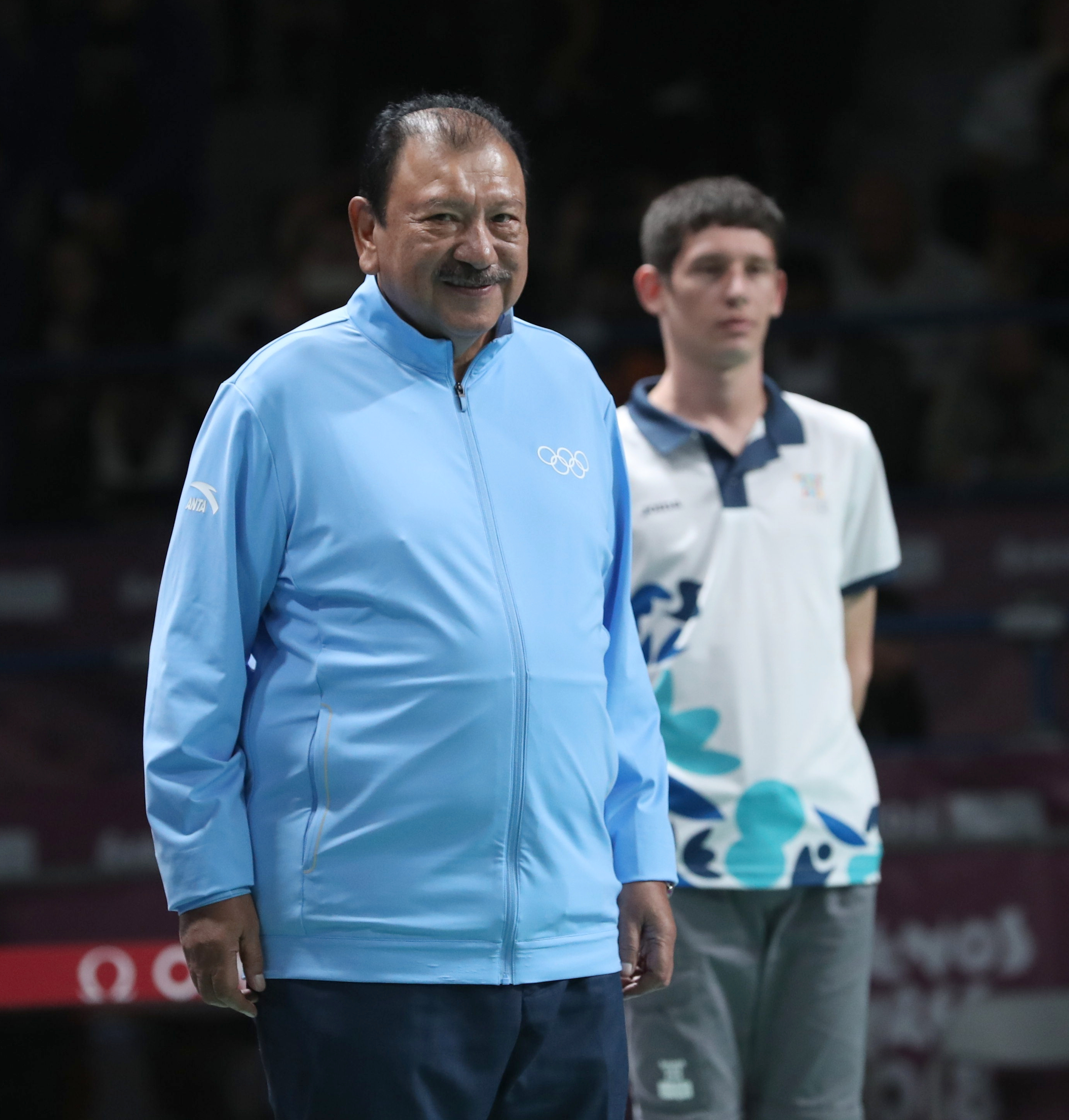
- HH Prince Tunku Imran during the 2018 Summer Youth Olympics

Tunku Muda Serting
- Tenure: 1976 – present
- Predecessor: Tuanku Ja'afar
- Born: 21 March 1949 (age 77); Istana Hinggap, Seremban, Negeri Sembilan, Federation of Malaya
- Spouse: Mahirah Abdullah (née Moira Rodrigo) (m. 1987; div. 2019) Nora Marzuki (m. 2013)
Names
- Tunku Imran bin Tunku Ja'afar (at birth)
Regnal name
- Yang Amat Mulia Tan Sri Dato’ Seri Utama Tunku Imran ibni Almarhum Tuanku Ja'afar
- Dynasty: Pagaruyung
- Father: Tuanku Ja’afar ibni Almarhum Tuanku Abdul Rahman
- Mother: Tuanku Najihah binti Almarhum Tunku Besar Burhanuddin
- Religion: Sunni Islam

Tunku Imran

5th President of the Olympic Council of Malaysia
- In office 1998–2018
- Preceded by: Hamzah Abu Samah
- Succeeded by: Mohamad Norza Zakaria

5th President of the World Squash Federation
- In office 1989–1996
- Preceded by: (Scotland) Ronnie Sinclair
- Succeeded by: (New Zealand) Susie Simcock

Personal details
- Born: Tunku Imran bin Tunku Ja’afar Seremban, Negeri Sembilan, Malaysia
- Children: 6

Tan Sri Tunku Imran ibni Almarhum Tuanku Ja’afar (born 21 March 1949) is a member of Negeri Sembilan royal family who is the Tunku Muda Serting. He is the grandson of the first King of Malaysia, Tuanku Abdul Rahman. His father Tuanku Ja'afar, was also the 10th King of Malaysia. He was born as the second son of Tuanku Ja’afar, the 10th Yang di-Pertuan Besar (Grand Ruler) of Negeri Sembilan, Malaysia. He is often unofficially known in English as Prince Tunku Imran.

He also a former President of the Commonwealth Games Federation, and was also the president of the Olympic Council of Malaysia. He is an Honorary Member of the International Olympic Committee.

== Childhood ==
HH Prince Tunku Imran was born at Istana Hinggap (Hinggap Palace), Seremban, Negeri Sembilan on 21 March 1949 as the second son of Tuanku Ja'afar and his wife Tuanku Najihah.

His siblings in birth order are :

- Eldest sister Tunku Tan Sri Naquiah, Tunku Dara (26 December 1944)
- Elder brother Tunku Dato' Seri Utama Naquiyuddin, Tunku Laxamana (8 March 1947)
- Younger sister Tunku Puan Sri Jawahir, Tunku Puteri (27 January 1952)
- Youngest sister Tunku Dato' Seri Irinah (23 November 1957)
- Youngest brother Tunku Dato' Seri Nadzaruddin (26 October 1959)

== Education ==
- The King's School, Canterbury, Kent, United Kingdom
- University of Nottingham, United Kingdom (LLB 1970).

== Career ==
Barr-at-Law (Gray's Inn 1971). Indonesian Representative for PERNAS 1972–1973, CEO Haw Par (Malaysia) Sdn Bhd 1973–1976, CEO Antah Holdings 1977–2001, Founder of the S.P.A conglomerate, Chairman of Yayasan Sime Darby, Chairman of Aluminium Company of Malaysia Bhd, Minho (Malaysia) Bhd and Lafarge Malayan Cement Bhd, Group Chairman Petra Group, Austral Enterprises Bhd, Island & Peninsular Bhd and Hwang-DBS (Malaysia) Bhd. Business Adviser to Jones, Lang Wootton and Partners, Jimah Power Generation IPP, 7-Eleven, Pepsi, Mirinda, 7UP, Bleu, (Permanis), UTV, Granley Developments, Biwater, Clipper Power, Vectel Networks, Schindler, Giant Hypermarkets, Lenga Palm Oil, Noble Mineral Resources, Global Gold Holdings, Sino Hua-An International, Antah Insurance, BWI Hotels, Cavendish Property Group etc.....

Chair Fndn for Sporting Excellence, and the Young Malaysians Society. President Malaysia Heritage Trust, Malaysian German Chamber of Commerce & Industry, President of Olympic Council of Malaysia, Vice President of the International Cricket Council, Malaysian Cricket Assoc, and World Squash Fed 1989–1996. President of Commonwealth Games Federation. Chair Fndn for Sporting Excellence, and the Young Malaysians Society. Malaysian Chef de Mission 24th Olympic Games at Seoul 1988.

Trustee Yayasan Tunku Naquiyuddin since 1995, Tuanku Ja’afar Coll. Dir Inst of Strategy & International Studies. Mbr National Sports Council of Malaysia, Malaysian Business Council, etc.

== Family ==
He married Che' Engku Mahirah binti Abdullah (née Moira Rodrigo) on 18 February 1987 and divorced on 1 July 2019.

He secondly married Che' Engku Noor Asmara binti Abang Marzuki, simply known as Nora Marzuki on 28 March 2013.

He has 5 children :

- Tunku Khairil Imran (s/o Che' Engku Mahirah)
- Tunku Abdul Rahman Aminullah (s/o Che' Engku Mahirah)
- Nor Marzuki bin Musa (s/o Noor Asmara from previous marriage)
- Noreen Nong binti Musa (d/o Noor Asmara from previous marriage)
- Nor Nadia Abdullah Marzuki (d/o Noor Asmara from previous marriage)

== Honours ==
He has been awarded:

=== Honours of Negeri Sembilan ===
- Negeri Sembilan
  - Recipient of the Royal Family Order of Yam Tuan Radin Sunnah (DKYR)
  - Knight Grand Commander of the Order of Loyalty to Negeri Sembilan (SPNS) – Dato' Seri Utama (19 July 1999)
  - Meritorious Service Medal (PJK)

=== Honours of Malaysia ===
- Malaysia
  - Member of the Order of the Defender of the Realm (AMN) (1980)
  - Commander of the Order of Loyalty to the Crown of Malaysia (PSM) - Tan Sri (1992)

=== Trivia ===
During the opening ceremony of the 2014 Commonwealth Games, alongside Queen Elizabeth II, Imran struggled to open the baton that contained her message, but did so eventually amidst great relief and good humour.

Malaysian royalty
Preceded by Tunku Naquiyuddin	Line of succession to the throne of Negeri Sembilan; 3rd position	Succeeded by Vacant
