= Tunku Naquiyuddin =

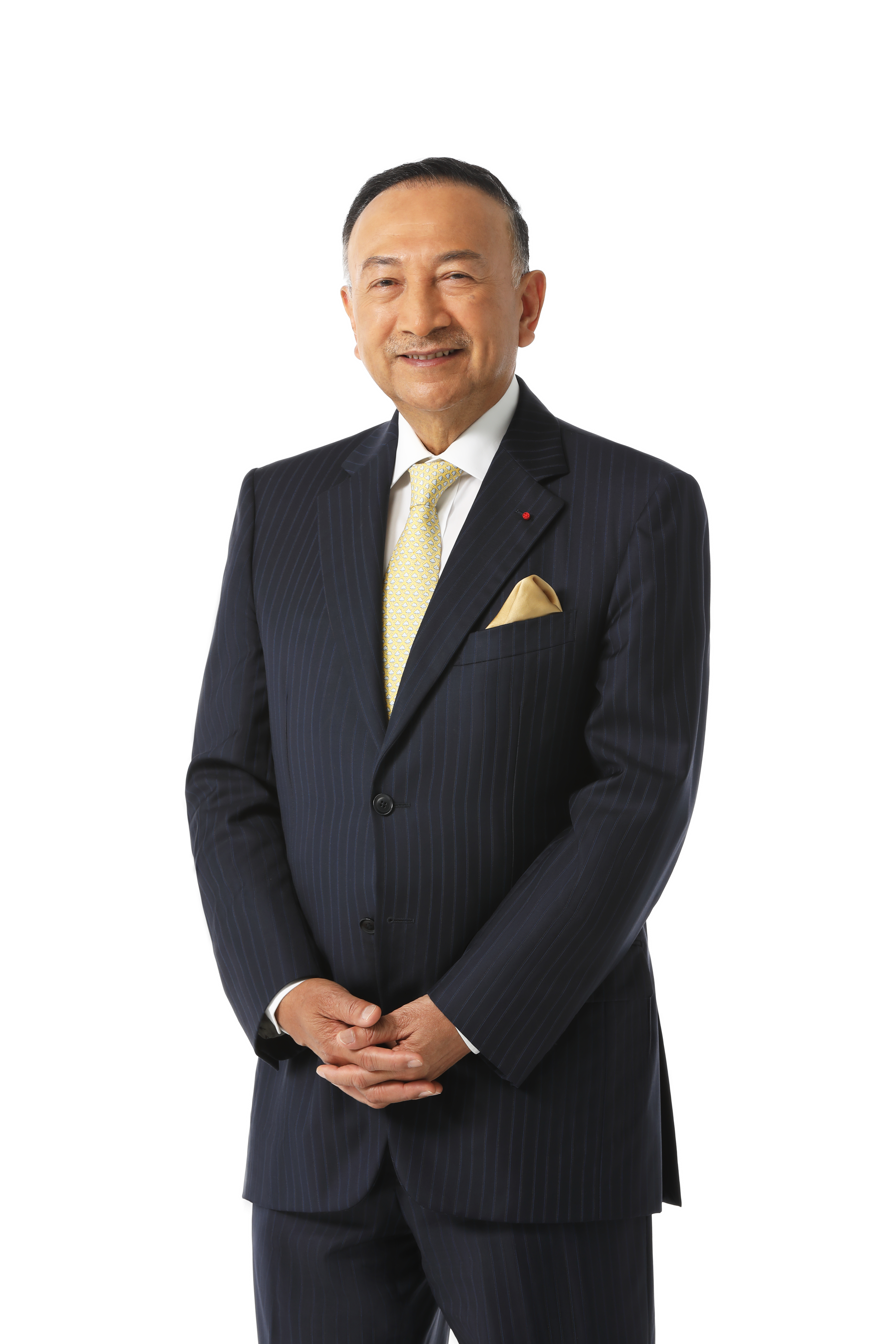

Tunku Laxamana
- Tenure: 1976 – present
- Predecessor: Tunku Nasir
- Born: 8 March 1947 (age 79); Seri Menanti, Negeri Sembilan, Federation of Malaya (now Malaysia)
- Spouse: Tunku Nurul Hayati (m. 1977)
- Issue: Tunku Mohamed Alauddin; Tunku Alia Nadira; Tunku Nadia Sahiya; Tunku Khairul Zaim
Names
- Tunku Naquiyuddin bin Tunku Ja'afar (at birth)
Regnal name
- Dato’ Seri Utama Tunku Naquiyuddin ibni Almarhum Tuanku Ja'afar
- Dynasty: Pagaruyung
- Father: Tuanku Ja’afar ibni Almarhum Tuanku Abdul Rahman
- Mother: Tuanku Najihah binti Almarhum Tunku Besar Burhanuddin
- Religion: Sunni Islam

Dato' Seri Utama Tunku Naquiyuddin ibni Almarhum Tuanku Ja'afar (born 8 March 1947) is a member of Negeri Sembilan royal family who is the Tunku Laxamana. He is the eldest son of Tuanku Jaafar ibni Almarhum Tuanku Abdul Rahman, the tenth Yang di-Pertuan Besar of Negeri Sembilan, who was also the tenth Yang di-Pertuan Agong (King of Malaysia). He served as the Regent of Negeri Sembilan from 1994 to 1999 when his father was elected as the King of Malaysia.

Tunku Naquiyuddin had been a Malaysia's well-known member of royalty, and was expected to succeed his father as the Yang di-Pertuan Besar of Negeri Sembilan. However, he was bypassed as Ruler in favour of his cousin, Tunku Muhriz, upon the death of his father.

== Early life ==
The eldest son of Tuanku Ja'afar, of Negeri Sembilan, Tunku Naquiyuddin is a former diplomat and an active businessman with interests spanning a broad spectrum. Besides serving as Executive Chairman of Antah HealthCare Group, he sits on the Board of four public companies – Orix Leasing (M) Bhd., Kian Joo Can Factory Berhad, Sino Hua-An International Berhad, Ann Joo Resources Bhd and more recently, Noble Mineral Resources Limited, a gold exploration company listed in the Australian Securities Exchange. He was born on March 8, 1947, at the royal capital of Seri Menanti to the future Yang di-Pertuan Besar of Negri Sembilan, Tuanku Ja'afar and the future Tuanku Ampuan of Negri Sembilan, Tunku Najihah binti Tunku Besar Burhanuddin.

Tunku Naquiyuddin studied at the Anderson School, Ipoh; Tuanku Besar School, Tampin; Junior King's School, Sturry, Kent; King's School, Canterbury; and read International Politics at the University College of Wales at Aberystwyth (later known as the University of Wales, Aberystwyth) and graduated with a Bachelor of Science degree with Honours in economics from the same college.

He served in the Ministry of Foreign Affairs and was posted as the 2nd Secretary with the Malaysian Embassy in Paris. Tunku Naquiyuddin later headed Antah Holdings Berhad as its chairman, a position held till 2007, which was vacated for a 5-year period during his tenure as the Regent of Negeri Sembilan from 1994 to 1999.

Tunku Naquiyuddin was also a Council Member of the Business Council for Sustainable Development, a Geneva-based organization, Founder and Head of the Federation of Public Listed Companies, Council Member of the Canada-ASEAN Center and Committee Member of the Bursa Malaysia. He is also the Pro-Chancellor of the Univ. Kebangsaan Malaysia, Patron of the Negri Sembilan Rugby Football Union, Seremban Half Marathon, Raintree Club (Kuala Lumpur), etc. He is the President of the Federation of Public Listed Companies (FPLC) since 1987, and Malaysian Water Skiing Association. He is the Patron of Malaysia Board Sailing Association, and Negri Sembilan Squash Racquet Association. He is the chairman of the Board of Trustees of Tuanku Ja'afar Educational Trust since 1993, and of College Tuanku Ja'afar since 1991; of Yayasan Tunku Naquiyuddin since 1995. He has also served as a committee member of the Malaysia Wildlife Conservation Federation, Malaysia-France Economic & Trade Association (MAFRETA), World Wide Fund for Nature (Malaysia), Seremban Half Marathon, Singer World Squash Championships, Antah Holdings Bhd. 1999, and Kian Joo Can Factory Bhd. Dir. Malayawata Steel Bhd., etc. Hon. Member Royal Selangor Golf Club. Rcvd: DK, SPTJ, PJK, DKYR, SPNS, SPMS, PPT, SPMP of Perlis (2001), Grand Collar of the Order of Bernardo O'Higgins of Chile (2004).

A keen philanthropist, Tunku Naquiyuddin founded Yayasan Tunku Naquiyuddin, a charitable foundation that provides assistance to young students from poor families. He is also the founder and patron of the annual Seremban Half Marathon, whereby proceeds from the event are used to supplement financial needs of prospective junior athletes from the state.

== Family ==
Tunku Naquiyuddin is married to Tunku Puan Muda Tunku Dato' Seri Nurul Hayati binti Tunku Dato' Bahador. They have two sons and two daughters:

- Tunku Mohamed Alauddin bin Tunku Naquiyuddin (born 9 February 1978)
- Tunku Alia Nadira binti Tunku Naquiyuddin (born 26 January 1980)
- Tunku Nadia Sahiya binti Tunku Naquiyuddin (born in 1982)
- Tunku Khairul Zaim bin Tunku Naquiyuddin (born 12 November 1985)

== Bypassed for the throne ==
On 29 December 2008, the Council of Undang proclaimed Tunku Muhriz as the 11th Yang di-Pertuan Besar of Negeri Sembilan succeeding Almarhum Tuanku Jaafar ibni Almarhum Tuanku Abdul Rahman who had died on 27 December 2008.

This decision was made following intense discussions among the four Undangs. At least two, if not all four of the Undangs strongly championed Tunku Muhriz's candidacy. They refused to budge when it was suggested that they consider Tunku Naquiyuddin, Tuanku Jaafar's eldest son, instead as the next Ruler of Negeri Sembilan. Naquiyuddin also had two younger brothers. Together with Tunku Muhriz, these four princes were the main heirs to the throne when Tuanku Jaafar died. However, Tuanku Jaafar had replaced his elder brother whose son, Tunku Muhriz, at the time was barely out of his teens. Tunku Muhriz was considered too young to replace his father and the throne was given to his uncle Tuanku Jaafar.

Due to a lifelong habit of keeping a low profile, Tuanku Muhriz was largely unknown outside royal circles in Negeri Sembilan compared to Tunku Naquiyuddin, who was very media friendly. However, Tuanku Muhriz established and maintained strong ties with the Undangs, the general nobility, the lesser royalty and people of Negeri Sembilan, and more so since moving back to the state a few years ago. He also has powerful backers within the political establishment in the state, with the then serving former Menteri Besar Tan Sri Mohd Isa Abdul Samad among his supporters.

Known for his charitable activities, Tunku Naquiyuddin was also a keen sportsman and a top corporate figure popular with the public, making him an ideal candidate to be the Yang di-Pertuan Besar of Negri Sembilan. However, he was ultimately bypassed when the four Undangs, or territorial chiefs, of the state chose his cousin Tuanku Muhriz to ascend to the throne.

== Honours ==
He has been awarded :

=== Honours of Negeri Sembilan ===
- Member of the Royal Family Order of Negeri Sembilan (DKNS)
- Recipient of the Royal Family Order of Yam Tuan Radin Sunnah (DKYR)
- Knight Grand Commander of the Order of Loyalty to Negeri Sembilan (SPNS) – Dato' Seri Utama (1991)
- Knight Grand Commander of the Grand Order of Tuanku Ja'afar (SPTJ) – Dato' Seri
- The Distinguished Conduct Medal (Pingat Pekerti Terpilih, PPT)
- The Meritorious Service Medal (Pingat Jasa Kebaktian, PJK)

=== Honours of Malaysia ===
- Perlis
  - Knight Grand Commander of the Order of the Crown of Perlis (SPMP) – Dato' Seri (2001)
- Selangor
  - Knight Grand Commander of the Order of the Crown of Selangor (SPMS) – Dato' Seri

=== Foreign honours ===
- Chile
  - Knight Grand Cross of the Order of Bernardo O'Higgins (2004)
- France
  - Officer of the National Order of Merit (1998)
  - National Order of the Legion of Honour (2005)
  - Ordre des Palmes Académiques

Malaysian royalty
Preceded by Tunku Laksamana Nasir	Line of succession to the throne of Negeri Sembilan; 2nd position	Succeeded by ?
