= 2026 Negeri Sembilan constitutional crisis =

Royal and administrative crisis in Negeri Sembilan, Malaysia

- Date: 17 April 2026 – ongoing
- Location: Negeri Sembilan, Malaysia
- Cause: Administrative disputes in the Luak of Sungai Ujong; Announcement of the removal of Tuanku Muhriz by the Undang Yang Empat
- Participants: Yang di-Pertuan Besar of Negeri Sembilan; Undang Yang Empat; Menteri Besar of Negeri Sembilan; Members of 15th and 16th Negeri Sembilan State Legislative Assembly
- Outcome: Tunku Nadzaruddin is installed as pretender to the throne of Yang di-Pertuan Besar by the Undang Yang Empat.; Withdrawal of support of Menteri Besar Aminuddin Harun by Barisan Nasional; Removal and installation of new Undangs of Sungei Ujong, Jelebu, and Rembau.; 2026 Negeri Sembilan state election.; Pakatan Harapan-Barisan Nasional state government replaced by Barisan Nasional-Perikatan Nasional state government.; Dismissal of all Negeri Sembilan State Executive Council members, except Menteri Besar Ismail Lasim, by Tuanku Muhriz; Suspension of state secretary and state legal advisor by the state executive council (not enforced); Resignation of Ismail Lasim as Menteri Besar (disputed)

The 2026 Negeri Sembilan constitutional crisis is an ongoing constitutional and customary administrative crisis that began on 17 April 2026 in Negeri Sembilan, Malaysia. The crisis centres on a jurisdictional clash between the institution of the Yang di-Pertuan Besar of Negeri Sembilan, Tuanku Muhriz ibni Almarhum Tuanku Munawir, and the institution of the Undang Yang Empat (The Four Ruling Chiefs) led by the Undang of Sungei Ujong, Mubarak Dohak, involving the state government. The turmoil was rooted in an internal customary administration dispute in the Luak of Sungei Ujong that began in 2024, which subsequently led to the intervention of the Council of the Yang di-Pertuan Besar and Ruling Chiefs (DKU).

On 17 April 2026, the DKU declared the retroactive dismissal of Mubarak Dohak. In retaliation, on 19 April, Mubarak Dohak, with the majority support of the Undang Yang Empat, declared the removal of Tuanku Muhriz from the throne based on an interpretation of Article 10 of the Laws of the Constitution of Negeri Sembilan 1959. The faction also named Tunku Nadzaruddin ibni Almarhum Tuanku Ja'afar as the new Yang di-Pertuan Besar. The legality of both declarations have been disputed. Tuanku Muhriz and Tunku Nadzaruddin are first cousins through Tuanku Abdul Rahman ibni Almarhum Tuanku Muhammad, the eight Yang di-Pertuan Besar and the first Yang di-Pertuan Agong.

The crisis partially contributed to the dissolution of the state assembly and subsequent state election, which saw a coalition between Barisan Nasional and Perikatan Nasional (BN–PN) come to power, replacing the preceding Pakatan Harapan–Barisan Nasional (PH–BN) government. Following the BN–PN state executive council's recognition of the declaration removing Tuanku Muhriz, he dismissed all ten of its members except for Menteri Besar Ismail Lasim. The Ismail-led state executive council also attempted to suspend the state secretary and legal advisor but was unsuccessful.

== Background and factions ==
Those aligned with Tuanku Muhriz include the 11th Undang of Sungei Ujong Muhammad Faris Johari (since 2026), the 17th Undang of Jelebu Azrin Khairi (since 2026), the 22nd Undang of Rembau Hassan Ab Hamid (since 2026), Tunku Besar Seri Menanti Tunku Ali Redhauddin (since 2009), and the eighth Menteri Besar of Negeri Sembilan Aminuddin Harun (2018 to 2026).

Supporters of Tunku Nadzaruddin include the 10th Undang of Sungei Ujong Mubarak Dohak (since 1993), the 16th Undang of Jelebu Maarof bin Mat Rashad (since 2019), the 15th Undang of Johol Muhammed Abdullah (since 2016), the 21st Undang of Rembau Abd Rahim bin Yassin (since 2024), Dato' Shahbandar of Sungei Ujong Badarudin Abdul Khalid (until 2026), Tunku Besar Tampin (the hereditary ruler of Tampin) Tunku Syed Razman (since 2005), and the ninth Menteri Besar Ismail Lasim (since 2026).

=== The Adat Perpatih System ===
The administrative and constitutional framework of Negeri Sembilan is anchored in Adat Perpatih, a customary law originating from Minangkabau, Sumatra, founded by Dato' Perpatih Nan Sebatang. Unlike absolute monarchies or systems of primogeniture (where the throne passes from father to the eldest son) practiced in other Malay states, Adat Perpatih employs a "bottom-up" hierarchical power structure that mirrors democratic principles.

In the Adat Perpatih hierarchy, power originates from the common people and is stratified through socio-political units:

- Perut: The smallest unit, consisting of maternal descendants of the same lineage. It is led by a Buapak, who is elected by consensus of the anak buah (family members).
- Suku: large clan of several Perut led by a Dato' Lembaga, appointed by consensus among the Buapak.
- Luhak: Territorial administrative districts (such as Luak Sungei Ujong, Jelebu, Johol, and Rembau). Each luak is headed by an Undang, elected and appointed by the Dato' Lembaga of their respective luak, with the consent of the Ibu Suku (clan matriarchs).
- Yang di-Pertuan Besar (Yamtuan Besar): The Head of State (ruler) who does not inherit the throne automatically. Instead, the ruler is elected and appointed by the consensus of the four principal territorial chiefs, known as the Undang Yang Empat.

=== Mechanism for removing the Yang di-Pertuan Besar ===
The Laws of the Constitution of Negeri Sembilan 1959 allow for the removal of the Yang di-Pertuan Besar by the four ruling chiefs. They may call upon the Yang di-Pertuan Besar to withdraw from performing his duties for a period or to abdicate and relinquish his position entirely if he should have "developed any great and serious defect derogatory to the quality of the Yang di-Pertuan Besar [...] become possessed of any base quality on account of which He would not be permitted by the Hukum Syarak [...] done any overt act detrimental to the sanctity, honour, and dignity of a Yang di-Pertuan Besar [...] or has deliberately disregarded the provisions of this Constitution," with any such call taking immediate effect provided a proclamation is issued by the four ruling chiefs and the Menteri Besar.

=== The Council of the Yang di-Pertuan Besar and Ruling Chiefs ===
The Dewan Keadilan dan Undang (DKU) or Council of the Yang di-Pertuan Besar and Ruling Chiefs is an advisory body relating to Malay customs in the state, possessing jurisdiction over matters "relating to the election or selection to or removal from or vacation of office" of the Undangs of Sungei Ujong, Jelebu, Johol, Rembau, and the Tunku Besar Tampin. The body consists of the Yang di-Pertuan Besar, the four Undangs, the Dato' Shahbandar of Sungei Ujong, the Tunku Besar Tampin, and the Tunku Besar Seri Menanti, and its advice is final and cannot be challenged.

== The conflict ==
=== Initial conflict within luak Sungei Ujong ===
The seeds of this constitutional crisis originated from internal turmoil within the luak of Sungei Ujong around 2024. The 10th Undang of Sungei Ujong, Mubarak Dohak, claimed that two customary chiefs, one of them being the Dato Andulika Mandalika Zainol Ariffin, had established an entity named 'Majlis Dato-Dato Lembaga Adat Sungei Ujong' (Council of Customary Chiefs of Sungei Ujong) without his approval and that the Council had applied for funds amounting to RM170,000 from the Negeri Sembilan Museum Board and the Member of Parliament (MP) for Seremban, Anthony Loke between 2019 and 2024.

When the office of the Undang was met with a request for a financial report concerning the funds granted to the Council, the office claimed to be unaware of the Council's existence and that it possessed no bank account where the funds were supposedly transferred until 1 July 2024. Following this, an investigation by the office of the Undang was said to have found evidence of abuse of power, resulting in the dismissal of the two chiefs on 1 December 2024. However, the two chiefs contested their dismissal, arguing that relevant procedures were not followed. Zainol Ariffin further claimed that a police investigation in 2024 had found no evidence wrongdoing, and that Mubarak himself had donated funds to the Council.

On 13 May 2025, the Telaga Undang, who acts an arbitrator in customary matters within the luak of Sungei Ujong, and the Waris Klana Hulu (Heirs of Klana Hulu), of which Mubarak Dohak is a member, removed him as Dato' Klana Petra and thus Undang of Sungei Ujong.

=== State-wide conflict and installation of Tunku Nadzaruddin as pretender ===
The matter was escalated to the Council of the Yang di-Pertuan Besar and Ruling Chiefs (DKU), which recommended that Mubarak's removal be accepted following a review of 33 claims of customary violations against him on 17 April 2026. On 19 April, the Undang Yang Empat, led by Mubarak, announced the removal of Tuanku Muhriz as the Yang di-Pertuan Besar, citing deliberate breaches in the discharge of royal duties, and the election of Tunku Nadzaruddin Tuanku Ja'afar as his replacement. The next day, Mubarak's removal as the Undang of Sungei Ujong was upheld by the DKU, and the state government under Aminuddin Harun regarded the Undang Yang Empat's declaration as illegitimate, citing Mubarak's prior dismissal. Aminuddin Harun also refused to sign the proclamation of Tuanku Muhriz's removal issued by the Undang Yang Empat, when it was presented to him on 20 April.

However, the DKU's decision was criticised by constitutional expert Rais Yatim, a former Menteri Besar of the state and a researcher of Adat Perpatih, who claimed the DKU had ignored objections from Tunku Syed Razman, the Tunku Besar Tampin, and Muhammad Abdullah, the Undang of Johol. He also described the action as overstepping the boundaries of the customary separation of powers, claiming that the DKU is legally only an advisory body. He further emphasized that the power to dismiss an Undang rests solely upon the consensus of the Lembaga (customary chiefs) within the luak of Sungei Ujong itself.

Following Aminuddin's dismissal of the proclamation removing Tuanku Muhriz, the constitutional crisis veered into the political realm as the four ruling chiefs and Tunku Besar Tampin, the hereditary ruler of Tampin, called for him to resign. The four ruling chiefs boycotted the opening of the state assembly on 23 April, resulting in its postponement. On 27 April, 14 members of Barisan Nasional in the state legislative assembly withdrew their support for Aminuddin, accusing him of disrespecting traditional institutions and mishandling the crisis, though this decision was ultimately reversed by Barisan Nasional's national leadership. Nevertheless, the state assembly was dissolved on 5 June to pave the way for an early election after a protracted deadlock.

On the same day, a special sitting of the Council of the Yang di-Pertuan Besar and Ruling Chiefs called by the four ruling chiefs, the Tunku Besar Tampin, and Dato' Shahbandar of Sungei Ujong was held at the residence of Tunku Besar Tampin. Police initially prevented customary leaders and dignitaries from entering the premises. The special sitting was held with the intention of proclaiming Tunku Nadzaruddin as the 12th Yang di-Pertuan Negeri, but he was similarly prevented by police from attending and was instead proclaimed at a hotel in Malacca. An injunction was subsequently issued by the Seremban High Court preventing the four ruling chiefs and the Tunku Besar Tampin from convening the DKU or taking any decisions until the question of jurisdiction and justiciability related to the dispute was determined. The injunction also prevented the removal of Raja Norazli Raja Nordin as the body's secretary over his refusal to schedule a meeting to discuss the crisis.

=== Installation of new Undangs; UMNO-led state government supports pretender ===
On 27 June, Tuanku Muhriz formalised the installation of two new Undangs, Muhammad Faris Johari as the 11th Undang of Sungei Ujong, and Hassan Ab Hamid as the 22nd Undang of Rembau; the position of Undang of Rembau was declared vacant despite the installation of Abd Rahim bin Yassin in 2024, as Abd Rahim's appointment was supposedly never formally proclaimed. On 30 July, the Dato' Shahbandar of Sungei Ujong, Badarudin Abdul Khalid, was removed from his role, and on 31 July, the Undang of Jelebu, Maarof Mat Rashad, was removed by the DKU citing customary violations. Maarof's removal was made retroactive, taking effect on 31 May 2025.

The 2026 Negeri Sembilan state election held on 1 August returned a Barisan Nasional majority. While Jalaluddin Alias was considered for the position of Menteri Besar, having played a leading role in the coalition's withdrawal of support for Aminuddin in April, Ismail Lasim was ultimately chosen instead. The appointment of the Menteri Besar is the sole responsibility of the Yang di-Pertuan Besar. Jalaluddin, along with a number of UMNO assemblypersons, were absent from Ismail's swearing-in ceremony on 2 August.

On 3 August, a secret meeting was reportedly held involving the four ruling chiefs, Tunku Nadzaruddin, Barisan Nasional chairman Ahmad Zahid Hamidi, secretary-general Asyraf Wajdi Dusuki, federal law minister Azalina Othman Said, and Ismail Lasim. At the meeting, Ismail was said to have received the ruling chiefs' and Tunku Nadzaruddin's approval to become Menteri Besar and signed the proclamation removing Tuanku Muhriz and installing Tunku Nadzaruddin as the Yang di-Pertuan Besar. This meeting was first publicised by the The Straits Times on 8 September, which also alleged that UMNO's top leadership had decided to side with the rebel ruling chiefs. The day following, Ismail lodged a police report claiming to have been forced to sign the proclamation. A later report by The Vibes on 21 September also claimed that Ismail was scolded by one of the disputed Undangs, and the meeting was more confrontational than previously reported.

On 15 September however, the Negeri Sembilan State Executive Council (the cabinet for the Negeri Sembilan state government) in a meeting chaired by Ismail decided to recognise the proclamation's validity and instructed the state secretary to gazette the proclamation. The decision was announced the following day. Ismail Lasim publicly endorsed the executive council's decision but refused to elaborate further on his sudden change of position.

On 17 September, the Attorney General's Chambers's (AGC) declared that the state executive council did not possess the authority to determine the proclamation's validity, following which the state secretary announced that he would take no action. Meanwhile, the DKU continued to maintain the proclamation's non-validity and affirmed Tuanku Muhriz as the rightful Yang di-Pertuan Besar, referring to the installation of Tunku Nadzaruddin on 5 June as treason.

=== Termination of Exco members; Suspension of state secretary and state legal advisor ===
Tuanku Muhriz's order to revoke the appointment of all 10 state executive council members with effect from 20 September 2026. It was gazetted on 24 September 2026.

On 20 September, Tuanku Muhriz dismissed all 10 executive council members (Exco) except the Menteri Besar, citing their actions on 15 September as the basis for dismissal, under Article 38(5). (Note: Article 38(5): Subject to Clause (4), a member of the Executive Council other than the Menteri Besar shall hold office at the Ruler’s pleasure, unless the appointment of any member of the Executive Council shall have been revoked by the Ruler on the advice of the Menteri Besar but any member of the Council may at any time resign his office.) The dismissals were rejected by Ismail Lasim, who argued that the Yang di-Pertuan Besar did not have unilateral authority to do so, and that Article 38(5) must be read with Articles 38(4) (Note: Article 38(4): If the Menteri Besar ceases to command the confidence of the majority of the members of the Legislative Assembly, then unless at his request the Ruler dissolves the Legislative Assembly, he shall tender the resignation of the Executive Council.) and 40(1). (Note: Article 40(1): In the exercise of His functions under the Constitution of the State or any law or as a member of the Conference of Rulers the Ruler shall act in accordance with the advice of the Executive Council or of a member thereof acting under the general authority of the Council, except as otherwise provided by the Federal Constitution or the State Constitution; but shall be entitled, at His request, to any information concerning the Government of the State which is available to the Executive Council.)

On 21 September, The Vibes reported that internal sources have claimed Ismail Lasim had ceased communicating with the state secretary and state legal adivsor who refused to enforce the removal of Tuanku Muhriz, and that he has been seeking advice from his personal lawyer instead. It also reported that the Negeri Sembilan civil service is firmly behind Tuanku Muhriz as the legitimate ruler.

On 22 September, the executive council unanimously decided to suspend the state secretary Mohd Zafir Ibrahim and the state legal advisor Muzalmah Mustapha Kamal from their positions, and that the state financial officer Masri Razali and lawyer Fahmi Adilah will assume their posts respectively. Ismail also insisted that "all positions of state executive council members remain intact and valid". In response, the AGC stated that the suspension are invalid as their appointment and suspension fall under the jurisdiction of the Public Services Commission and the Judicial and Legal Services Commission respectively, not the state executive council.

Although their suspension were publicly announced by the state executive council, both state secretary and state legal advisor continue to report for work the next day and were not prevented from doing so. They also confirmed they have yet to receive any official letter on their purported suspension. Attorney General Mohd Dusuki Mokhtar also affirmed that the two must continue to carry out their duties as usual. Meanwhile, the 10 Exco members who were sacked by Tuanku Muhriz were barred from entering their offices at Wisma Negeri and carrying out their duties since 23 September.

On 23 September, an "ice-breaking session" between Tunku Nadzaruddin, the four disputed Undangs, Tunku Besar of Tampin, Dato Shahbandar of Sungai Ujong, Menteri Besar and state executive council members was scheduled to be held at the Tuanku Ja'afar Royal Gallery at 9:00am, but was suddenly relocated to the Royale Chulan Hotel, before ultimatedly cancelled at 10:30am due to "security concerns" and pressure from authorities. On the same day, a letter purportedly written by Ismail and addressed to Percetakan Nasional Malaysia Berhad (PNMB) was circulated online. In the letter, the state government allegedly demanded PNMB to cancel and stop all printing and publication work for a gazette regarding Tuanku Muhriz's order to dismiss the 10 Exco members until further notice.

Despite that, on 24 September, Tuanku Muhriz's order to remove the said 10 Exco members were officially published in the Government of Negeri Sembilan Gazette, with retrospective effect from 20 September, the date of the announcement of their removal. The next day, the photos of the 10 Exco members were removed from the Negeri Sembilan State Government website, with only the photo of Menteri Besar Ismail Lasim remaining in the "State Executive Council" page. When pressed on by the media over his sudden reversal of stand during a press conference on 24 September, Ismail Lasim evaded the question by stating that the issue of him allegedly being coerced to sign the proclamation to remove Tuanku Muhriz has been "overtaken by events", and denied there was any shift in his position. He also refused to offer any comment over the status of his police report lodged back on 8 September.

On 25 September, the disputed Undangs announced that the Conference of Rulers (Majlis Raja-Raja) was informed of Tunku Nadzaruddin ascension to the throne. Meanwhile, Rais Yatim was charged under the Sedition Act 1948 at the Ayer Keroh Sessions Court for his statement back on 5 June at the A' Famosa Resort, where he called for recognition and loyalty to Tunku Nadzaruddin as the new Yang di-Pertuan Besar. He pleaded not guilty to the charge and was granted bail at RM8,000 with one surety. On 7 October, a court case filed by the four Undangs at the Kuala Lumpur High Court in July with the intention of compelling the Menteri Besar to sign the 19 April proclamation removing Tuanku Muhriz was withdrawn.

On 12 October, The Straits Times reported that Tuanku Muhriz had been invited by the chairman of the Conference of Rulers, Sultan Nazrin Azlan Shah of Perak, to attend the conference's meeting that was scheduled to be held from 13 to 15 October, a move seen as affirming Tuanku Muhriz's legitimacy. It also reported that Tuanku Muhriz would only attend the conference's pre-council meeting on 13 October instead, as he would oversaw the appointment of the new Undang of Jelebu on 14 October. Later in the same day, the Negeri Sembilan palace clarified that Tuanku Muhriz did not receive the invitation per se, as he does not need a formal invitation to attend the meeting. However, Tuanku Muhriz elected not to attend the conference as he wished to focus on state affairs and the installation of the new Undang of Jelebu.

On 14 October, Azrin Khairi was formally installed as the 17th Undang of Jelebu at the Seri Menanti Palace, in which he pledged allegiance to Tuanku Muhriz. The ceremony was attended by Tuanku Muhriz and his wife, members of the Jelebu customary delegation, and other state civil servants.

On 20 October, Tunku Nadzaruddin issued his first public statement since his alleged ascension to the throne in a joint statement with the disputed Undangs, declaring that the issue of the customs and the throne was settled with the removal of Tuanku Muhriz according to the Negeri Sembilan constitution. They also declare that Tuanku Muhriz's decree of revoking the ten state executive councillors were invalid and unconstitutional.

Removal and installation of the Undangs of Sungai Ujong, Jelebu, Rembau and Dato' Shahbandar of Sungai Ujong, which were gazetted on 23 October 2026; while the installation of the new Undang of Jelebu was gazetted on 11 November 2026.

On 23 October, the removal of Mubarak, Maarof, and Badarudin Abdul Khalid as Undang of Sungai Ujong, Undang of Jelebu and Dato' Shahbandar of Sungai Ujong respectively were officially gazetted. The same gazette also formalised the installation of Muhammad Faris and Hassan as the new Undangs for Sungai Ujong and Rembau. If legally valid, Tunku Nadzaruddin and the opposing Undangs' challenge to Tuanku Muhriz's throne would be further weakened. Meanwhile, the installation of Azrin Khairi as the new Undang of Jelebu was gazetted on 11 November.

On 14 November, Ismail confirmed that he and the ten terminated state executive councillors have withdrawn the dethronement letter and have pledged their support to Tuanku Muhriz as the rightful ruler. Ismail said that the decision was made in consideration of the Conference of Rulers' statement on 14 October and the Seremban High Court order dated 5 June, which affirmed Tuanku Muhriz's position as Yang di-Pertuan Besar.

=== Purported resignation of Menteri Besar Ismail Lasim ===
On 16 November, BN secretary general Zambry Abdul Kadir announced Ismail has resigned from the position of Menteri Besar. The announcement was however disputed by the Tuanku Muhriz's palace, which reiterated that the Menteri Besar only resigned on the consent of the Yang di-Pertuan Besar. The authenticity of the resignation letter delivered to the palace on 17 November at midnight was also questioned, as 80 minutes before BN's announcement, both Muhriz and Ismail have agreed to meet on 20 November.

On 17 November, Tuanku Muhriz granted an audience with Ismail Lasim at the Istana Hinggap in Seremban but the details of the meeting was undisclosed. On the same day, MalaysiaKini reported that its source claimed Ismail did not voluntarily resigned and has never submitted any letter to the palace. Ismail's son Naim Ismail also questioned the announcement of his father's resignation, and suggested that someone else may have written the resignation letter and made his father a scapegoat in the crisis.

The next day, it was reported that Tuanku Muhriz has ordered Ismail to continue to serve as Menteri Besar, Ismail also attended several government meetings and events as usual. Ismail's press secretary Mohd Fasha Musthafa also confirmed that he still serves as the Menteri Besar, but was unable to verify whether it was done on Tuanku Muhriz's instructions. Meanwhile, state secretary Mohd Zafir stated that he did not receive any official confirmation that Ismail has resigned as Menteri Besar, he also stated that there are no explicit rules or procedures on a Menteri Besar's resignation, and that it is unprecedented in the state.

== See also ==
- 1987 Ming Court Affair
- 2009 Perak constitutional crisis
- 2025 Perlis political crisis
