= Tunku Nadzaruddin =

Tunku Nadzaruddin تونكو نضار الدين
- Nadzaruddin in 2023

Yang di-Pertuan Besar of Negeri Sembilan (Pretender)
- Claimant: 19 April 2026 – present
- Contender: Muhriz
- Menteri Besar: Aminuddin Harun; Ismail Lasim

Tunku Panglima Besar
- Tenure: 2008 – 5 June 2026
- Predecessor: Tunku Abdullah
- Successor: Tunku Zain Al-'Abidin
- Born: 26 October 1959 (age 67); Kuala Lumpur, Selangor, Federation of Malaya (now Malaysia)
- Spouse: Tunku Mimi Wahida (m. 1997)
- Issue: 3
Names
- Tunku Nadzaruddin bin Tunku Ja'afar (at birth)
Regnal name
- Tunku Dato' Seri Nadzaruddin ibni Almarhum Tuanku Ja'afar
- Dynasty: Pagaruyung
- Father: Tuanku Ja’afar ibni Almarhum Tuanku Abdul Rahman
- Mother: Tuanku Najihah binti Almarhum Tunku Besar Burhanuddin
- Religion: Sunni Islam

Personal details
- Education: St. Paul's Institution; King George V School; Cheltenham College; Middlesex University (BSc)

Tunku Dato' Seri Nadzaruddin ibni Almarhum Tuanku Ja'afar (Jawi: تونكو نضار الدين ابن توانكو جعفر; born 26 October 1959) is a claimant of the Yang di-Pertuan Besar of Negeri Sembilan since April 2026. A member of Negeri Sembilan royal family, he was nominated by the original four Undangs and Tunku Besar of Tampin to claim the Negeri Sembilan throne in April 2026. He is the youngest son of Tuanku Jaafar ibni Almarhum Tuanku Abdul Rahman, the 10th Yang di-Pertuan Besar of Negeri Sembilan, who was also the tenth Yang di-Pertuan Agong (King of Malaysia). He was the Tunku Panglima Besar of Negeri Sembilan from 2008 to 2026.

== Early life and education ==
Tunku Nadzaruddin was born in Kuala Lumpur, Selangor on 26 October 1959 as the youngest of six siblings and the third son of Tuanku Ja'afar and Tunku Ampuan Najihah.

Tunku Nadzaruddin was educated at St. Paul's Institution and King George V School in Seremban and later at Cheltenham College in England. He obtained a Bachelor of Science (Hons) in Mathematics from Middlesex University, England.

Tuanku Muhriz (wearing the white mask), Tuanku Aishah Rohani (his left side), Muhammed Abdullah (his right side) and Tunku Syed Razman watching the funeral of Tunku Ampuan Najihah on 8 September 2023. Behind Tuanku Muhriz, there were Tunku Nadzaruddin, talking with a group of people and Tunku Zain Al-'Abidin (yawning).

== 2026 Negeri Sembilan constitutional crisis ==
On 19 April 2026 at the Balai Undang Luak Sungei Ujong, a declaration issued in the name of the Undang Yang Empat announced the removal of Tuanku Muhriz as Yang di-Pertuan Besar of Negeri Sembilan on grounds of alleged misconduct, and named Tunku Nadzaruddin as the 12th Yang di-Pertuan Besar. The declaration was read by Dato' Mubarak Dohak, whose removal as Undang of Sungei Ujong by his luak, effective 13 May 2025 over 33 alleged offences against custom, had been accepted by the Dewan Keadilan dan Undang (DKU) two days earlier. The Telaga Undang of Sungei Ujong said the declaration was invalid, and the Pakatan Harapan-led state government refused to recognise it.

In early June 2026, Tuanku Muhriz consented to the dissolution of the State Legislative Assembly, leading to a snap state election on 1 August in which Barisan Nasional won 18 of the 36 seats. On 5 June, Nadzaruddin was proclaimed as the 12th Yang di-Pertuan Besar in a ceremony held at a hotel in Alor Gajah, Malacca. The proclamation was read by Dato' Maarof Mat Rashad, who claimed to act on behalf of the Undang Yang Empat. On the same day, Prime Minister Anwar Ibrahim said the federal government continued to recognise Tuanku Muhriz as the ruler. On 9 June, the Comptroller of the Royal Household of the Negeri Sembilan Palace, Dato' Azizi Mohamad Ali, said that the proclamation was invalid and not recognised under the Constitution, laws and customs of Negeri Sembilan, and that by attempting to accept the title Nadzaruddin had relinquished the hereditary title of Tunku Panglima Besar of Negeri Sembilan. On 31 July, the DKU decided that Maarof had been removed by his luak with effect from 31 May 2023 and declared the office of Undang of Jelebu vacant.

On 16 September, members of the Negeri Sembilan State Executive Council announced that the proclamation removing Tuanku Muhriz was complete and recognised Nadzaruddin as the ruler. The DKU rejected the move as unconstitutional and void, having stated on 14 September that Tuanku Muhriz remained the lawful Yang di-Pertuan Besar. The Attorney General's Chambers said the executive council had no power to vacate the throne and that the move was unconstitutional, and the state secretary's office refused to gazette or act on the proclamation.

On 20 September, Tuanku Muhriz revoked the appointments of all ten state executive councillors, a decision disputed by Menteri Besar Ismail Lasim. The revocation was gazetted on 24 September, and the Attorney-General said on 26 September that it was valid under the state constitution. On 25 September, the disputed Undangs announced that the Conference of Rulers (Majlis Raja-Raja) was informed of Tunku Nadzaruddin ascension to the throne. Ismail Lasim had an audience with Tuanku Muhriz on 29 September.

On 4 October, the DKU issued a 17-page statement reaffirming that Tuanku Muhriz remained the lawful Yang di-Pertuan Besar, stating that it did not recognise any other person as holding the office, rejecting two letters dated 30 September issued in Tunku Nadzaruddin's name to the Chief Secretary to the Government and the Attorney-General, and urging the police and the Attorney General's Chambers to investigate. On 20 October, Tunku Nadzaruddin issued his first public statement since his alleged ascension to the throne in a joint statement with the disputed Undangs, declaring that the issue of the customs and the throne was settled with the removal of Tuanku Muhriz according to the Negeri Sembilan constitution. They also declare that Tuanku Muhriz's decree of revoking the ten state executive councillors were invalid and unconstitutional.

On 14 November, Ismail confirmed that he and the ten revoked state executive councillors has withdrawn the dethronement letter and has pledged his support to Tuanku Muhriz as the rightful ruler. Ismail said that the decision was made in consideration of the Conference of Rulers' statement on 14 October and the Seremban High Court order dated 5 June, which affirmed Tuanku Muhriz's position as Yang di-Pertuan Besar. Two days later, Ismail resigned as Menteri Besar.

== Personal life ==
Tunku Nadzaruddin is married to Tunku Mimi Wahida binti Tunku Abdullah Wahman, a former newsreader. They have two sons and one daughter:

- Tunku Muhammad Hazim Shah Raden bin Tunku Nadzaruddin (born 23 September 1999)
- Tunku Muhammad Mish'al Raden bin Tunku Nadzaruddin (born 30 April 2001)
- Tunku Ines Najihah Raden binti Tunku Nadzaruddin (born 23 September 2003)

He resides in Istana Serting, Jempol, Negeri Sembilan.

== Honours ==
=== Honours of Malaysia ===
- Negeri Sembilan
  - Recipient of the Royal Family Order of Yam Tuan Radin Sunnah (DKYR) (1984)
  - Knight Grand Commander of the Grand Order of Tuanku Ja'afar (SPTJ) – Dato' Seri (2000)
