= Muhammed Abdullah of Johol =

15th Undang Luak of Johol

Muhammed Abdullah محمد عبد الله
- His Grace; The Dato' Johan Pahlawan Lela Perkasa Sitiawan
- Muhammed in 2023

15th Undang of Johol
- Reign: 7 October 2016 – present (10 years, 1 month and 14 days)
- Kerjan: 24 March 2017
- Predecessor: Mohammad Jan Abdul Ghani
- Born: Muhammed bin Abdullah; 2 January 1966 (age 60); Kampung Tanggai, Johol, Negeri Sembilan, Federation of Malaya (now Malaysia)
- Spouse: Faridah Hanom binti Ja’afar
- Issue: 5
- House: Waris Baruh
- Father: Abdullah bin Che Mat
- Mother: Ajal binti Katik
- Religion: Sunni Islam
- Occupation: Teacher, businessman

Personal details
- Education: Malay College Kuala Kangsar; MARA University of Technology (Dip)

Military service
- Allegiance: Malaysia; Yang di-Pertuan Agong
- Branch/service: Royal Malaysian Navy; Territorial Army Regiment
- Years of service: 2020–present (Note: Awarded as an honorary one-star general by TLDM.)
- Rank: First Admiral (Note: Honorary rank.)
- Unit: Reserve Officer Training Unit

Muhammed bin Abdullah (Jawi: محمد بن عبد الله; born 2 January 1966) is a Malaysian teacher and businessman who served as the 15th Undang of Johol, one of the traditional domains (luak) of Negeri Sembilan, Malaysia. He was installed on 7 October 2016. Prior to serving as the Undang of Johol, he also served as the Dato' Baginda Tan Mas (now known as the Dato' Baginda Luak Johol) from 13 July 2007 until 27 March 2016.

== Early life and education ==
Muhammed bin Abdullah was born on 2 January 1966 in Kampung Tanggai, Johol, Negeri Sembilan, Federation of Malaya (now Malaysia). He belongs to the Biduanda Waris (Perut Baroh, Johol) clan through the lineage of his late mother, Ajal Katik. This lineage grants succession rights to the ancestral heritage of Sitiawan, the founder of the institution of the Undang of Luak Johol in 1723. His late father, Abdullah Che Mat, was a retiree from the Public Works Department (JKR). He is the youngest of six siblings.

Muhammed received his early education at Tunku Besar Tampin Primary School before being selected to attend the Malay College Kuala Kangsar (MCKK), where he completed his Form Six studies in the arts stream in 1979. He later pursued higher education at the MARA University of Technology (UiTM) in Shah Alam, Selangor, in 1986, graduating with a Diploma in Business (Insurance Business Management) in 1990.

== Early career ==
Muhammed worked as a temporary teacher, instructing English and Physical Education across three schools in Negeri Sembilan: Datuk Undang Abdul Manap Secondary School in Johol, SMK Palong Empat and Teriang Hilir Secondary School in Jelebu. He subsequently left the teaching profession to become an insurance officer at Syarikat Takaful, Bank Islam Malaysia Berhad. Shortly thereafter, he entered the corporate sector, serving as a director and chairman for several companies.

== Undang of Johol (2016–present) ==
On 15 December 2016, Muhammed officially presented himself to the Yang di-Pertuan Besar of Negeri Sembilan, Tuanku Muhriz, at Istana Besar Seri Menanti to complete his appointment as the 15th Undang of Johol. His appointment was confirmed by the Dewan Keadilan dan Undang Negeri Sembilan on 7 October 2016, following the dismissal of his predecessor, Mohammad Jan Abdul Ghani on 27 March 2016 for customary misconduct. Prior to ascending the throne, Muhammed had served as the Dato' Baginda Tan Mas (now known as the Dato' Baginda Luak Johol), also known as the Deputy of Undang of Johol since 13 July 2007.

Tuanku Muhriz (wearing the white mask), Tuanku Aishah Rohani (his left side), Muhammed Abdullah (his right side) and Tunku Syed Razman watching the funeral of Tunku Ampuan Najihah on 8 September 2023. Behind Tuanku Muhriz, there were Tunku Nadzaruddin, talking with a group of people and Tunku Zain Al-'Abidin (yawning).

The ascension concluded with the installation ceremony (Istiadat Kerjan), which included the traditional ritual purification bath (mandi bersiram) at Perigi Gondang and the Adat Menaikkan Daulat at the Gobah Tomb. The installation concluded at the Balai Undang Johol with declarations of loyalty from the Datuk Adat (customary chieftains), Ibu Waris and Ibu Soko (maternal clan heads).

=== 2026 Negeri Sembilan constitutional crisis ===
On 20 April at the Balai Undang Luak Sungei Ujong, Muhammed and the other three Undangs (Undang of Sungai Ujong Dato' Haji Mubarak bin Dohak @ Thahak, Undang of Jelebu Dato' Haji Maarof bin Mat Rashad, and Undang of Rembau Dato' Haji Abdul Rahim bin Yassin) declared the removal of Tuanku Muhriz over claims of alleged misconduct and named Tunku Nadzaruddin, the Tunku Panglima Besar of Negeri Sembilan and the third son of the 10th Yang di-Pertuan Besar of Negeri Sembilan Tuanku Ja'afar, as the 12th Yang di-Pertuan Besar of Negeri Sembilan. Aminuddin Harun rejected the declaration on the grounds that Mubarak, who signed and read the declaration, no longer held any authority as Undang, having not received the mandate from the Ibu Soko Klana Hulu and Anak Waris Klana Hulu. On the following day, the four Undang claimed that Mubarak's removal was not valid as the DKU members who were present during the special session did not make a decision on the matter and that the other three Undang did not agree with Mubarak's removal.

On 05 June, Tunku Nadzaruddin was proclaimed as the 12th Yang di-Pertuan Besar by Undang of Jelebu Maarof Mat Rashad, who represented the other three Undangs, at Park Royal A'Famosa Resort, Malacca. The ceremony took place after police obstructed Tunku Nadzaruddin from leaving the resort to head to the Tunku Besar Tampin official residence for the ceremony. Immediately after, Prime Minister Anwar Ibrahim announced that the federal government still recognises Tuanku Muhriz as the rightful Yang di-Pertuan Besar and that constitutional disputes must be resolved through lawful and established channels.

The constitutional crisis triggered the state election when Negeri Sembilan Menteri Besar Dato' Aminuddin Harun announced the dissolution of Negeri Sembilan State Legislative Assembly.

== Personal life ==
Muhammed is married to Faridah Hanom Jaafar and they have five children, which are three sons and two daughters.

== Title and styles ==
Styles of Muhammed bin Abdullah
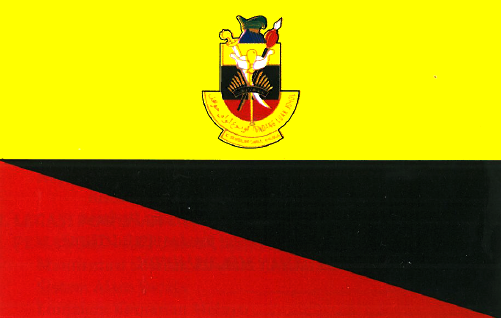
- Reference style: His Grace
- Spoken style: Your Grace

- 1966–2007: Muhammed bin Abdullah
- 2007–2016: His Grace Dato' Baginda Tan Mas Muhammed bin Abdullah, 13th Dato' Baginda Tan Mas of Johol
- 2016–present: His Grace Dato' Johan Pahlawan Lela Perkasa Sitiawan Dato' Muhammed bin Abdullah, 15th Undang of Johol

== Honours ==
=== Honours of Malaysia ===
- Negeri Sembilan
  - Recipient of Darjah Tertinggi Negeri Sembilan (DTNS) – Dato' (2016)
  - Recipient of Order of Loyalty to Negeri Sembilan (ANS)
  - Recipient of Distinguished Service Medal (PCM)
  - Recipient of Devotional Service Medal (PJK)
  - Recipient of Old Service Medal (PKL)

== See also ==
- 2026 Negeri Sembilan constitutional crisis
- Muhammad Faris Johari (Undang of Sungai Ujong)
- Azrin Khairi (Undang of Jelebu)
- Hassan Ab Hamid (Undang of Rembau)
