= Vehbi =

Vehbi is a Turkish name derived from the Arabic name Wahab. It may refer to:

- Vehbi Akdağ, Turkish wrestler
- Myfti Vehbi Dibra, one of the signatories of Albanian Declaration of Independence
- Vehbi Koç, Turkish businessman

== See also ==
- Vehbi Koç Foundation
