= Mohammad Jan Abdul Ghani =

Mohamad Jan bin Abdul Ghani
- Dato' Johan Pahlawan Lela Perkasa Sitiawan

Undang Luak of Johol
- Tenure: 13 March 2007 – 21 March 2016
- Predecessor: Abdul bin Ali
- Successor: Muhammed Abdullah
- Born: 10 August 1940; Kampung Rokan, Johol, Negeri Sembilan, Malaya
- Died: 7 November 2025 (aged 85); Hospital Pantai, Melaka, Malaysia
- Spouse: Sa'adah binti Othman
- Issue: 7
- Father: Abdul Ghani
- Religion: Islam

Mohammad Jan bin Abdul Ghani (10 August 1940 – 7 November 2025) was the 14th Undang of Luak Johol, one of the traditional states of Negeri Sembilan in Malaysia.

Mohammad Jan was installed as Dato' Baginda Tan Mas (heir apparent) on 30 December 1988, during the second month of the reign of the previous undang, Dato' Abdul bin Ali. He succeeded as undang on the death of Dato' Abdul on 13 March 2007. The official declaration was made by Dato' Jenang Saidin bin Abd'aziz and was witnessed by local government officials and the nobles of Luak Jelebu.

Prior to his accession, he worked as a teacher for several years before working for the National Bank of Malaysia. He retired in 1988, following his election as heir apparent of Luak Johol. He married Sa'adah binti Othman on 29 January 1969, and has six sons and one daughter. Mohammad Jan is the fourth of five siblings.

Mohammad Jan was deposed as Undang of Luak Johol on 27 March 2016 after he was found to have committed 13 offenses of misconduct. He was immediately succeeded as Undang by Muhammed Abdullah.
