= Muhammad Faris Johari =

11th Undang of Sungai Ujong

Muhammad Faris Johari محمد فاريس جوهري
- His Grace; The Dato' Klana Petra
- Official portrait, 2026

11th Undang of Sungai Ujong
- Reign: 22 April 2026 – present (6 months and 3 days)
- Kerjan: 27 June 2026
- Predecessor: Mubarak Dohak
- Born: Muhammad Faris bin Johari; 30 October 1997 (age 28); Seremban, Negeri Sembilan, Malaysia
- Spouse: Sharifah Amirah binti Syed Ismail Ash-Shahab (m. 2024)
- House: Waris Klana Hulu
- Father: Johari Meor Ngah
- Mother: Shazlina Abd Karim
- Religion: Sunni Islam
- Occupation: Accountant
- Education: MARA University of Technology (BAcc)

Muhammad Faris bin Johari (Jawi: محمد فاريس بن جوهري; born 30 October 1997) is a Malaysian accountant who served as the 11th Undang of Sungai Ujong, one of the traditional domains (luak) of Negeri Sembilan, Malaysia. He was installed on 22 April 2026. On 27 June 2026, his appointment was officially presented at the Istana Besar Seri Menanti, in the presence of Tuanku Muhriz.

== Personal life ==
Muhammad Faris is married to Sharifah Amirah binti Syed Ismail Ash-Shahab on 20 April 2024.

== Title and styles ==
Styles of Muhammad Faris bin Johari
- Reference style: His Grace
- Spoken style: Your Grace

- 1997–2026: Muhammad Faris bin Johari
- 2026–present: His Grace Dato' Klana Petra Dato' Muhammad Faris bin Johari, 11th Undang of Sungai Ujong

== Honours ==
=== Honours of Malaysia ===
- Negeri Sembilan
  - Recipient of Darjah Tertinggi Negeri Sembilan (DTNS) – Dato' (2026)

== See also ==
- 2026 Negeri Sembilan constitutional crisis
- Azrin Khairi (Undang of Jelebu)
- Muhammed Abdullah (Undang of Johol)
- Hassan Ab Hamid (Undang of Rembau)
