= Government English School =

Government English School may refer to:

- SMK King George V, Seremban
- Sultan Abdul Hamid College, Alor Star
