= Mubarak Dohak =

10th Dato' Klana Petra, Undang Luak of Sungai Ujong

Mubarak Dohak @ Thahak
- His Grace; The Dato' Klana Petra
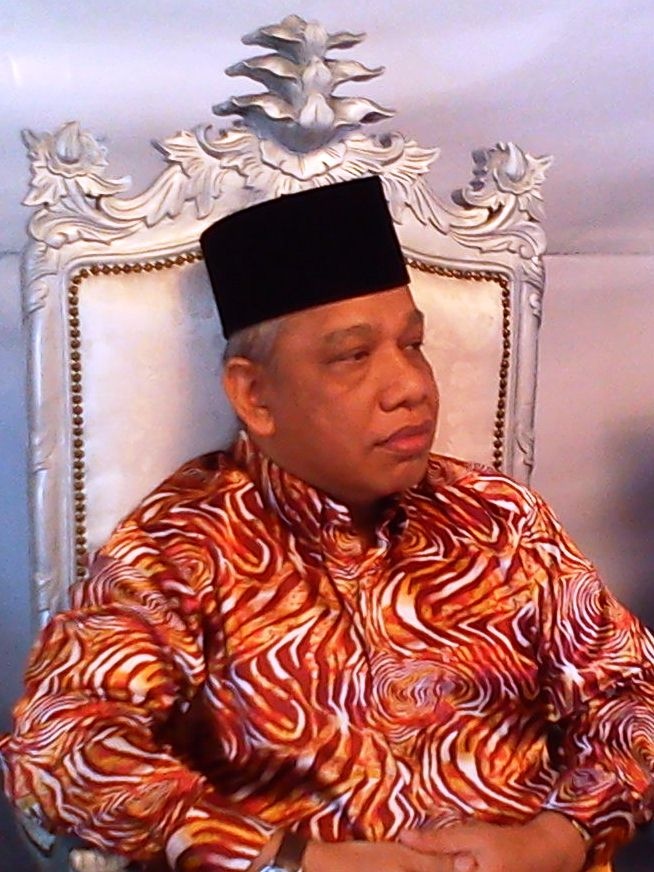

10th Undang of Sungai Ujong
- Reign: 29 December 1993 – 13 May 2025
- Installation: June 2005
- Predecessor: Mohammad Kassim Abdul Rashid
- Successor: Muhammad Faris Johari (since 27 June 2026, disputed)
- Born: Mubarak bin Dohak @ Thahak; 11 November 1961 (age 65); Pantai, Seremban, Negeri Sembilan, Federation of Malaya (now Malaysia)
- Spouse: Noor Hashimah binti Abu Bakar (m. 1984)
- Issue: 1) Nurul Ain Mubarak; 2) Siti Shahrizat Mubarak; 3) Ahmad Nazir Mubarak; 4) Nurdina Zaina Mubarak; 5) Ahmad Shahfiq Mubarak
- House: Hulu
- Father: Dohak Abu Samah
- Mother: Lawiyah Alwi
- Religion: Sunni Islam

Mubarak bin Dohak @ Thahak (born 11 November 1961 at Pantai, Seremban) was the 10th Dato' Klana Petra (or Undang) of Sungei Ujong, one of the traditional domains (luak) of Negeri Sembilan, Malaysia. He was installed on 29 December 1993. He is the head of the Waris Hulu lineage; the other noble lineage of Sungei Ujong is Waris Hilir.

== Early life ==
Mubarak Dohak was born on 11 November 1961 in Kampung Telaga Undang, nearby Pantai. He is the only child of the late Dohak bin Sutan Nara Haji Abu Samah and Lawiyah binti Amar Setia Alwi. His father died when he was at the age of three years old.

He received his early education at King George V Primary School from 1968 to 1973, and then continued his studies at King George V Secondary School from 1974 to 1978, and successfully obtained an MCE.

== 2026 Negeri Sembilan constitutional crisis ==
On 17 April 2026, Negeri Sembilan Menteri Besar Dato' Aminuddin Harun announced that Mubarak was removed from his office as Undang of Sungei Ujong, with effect from 13 May 2025, for 33 alleged offences by Mubarak relating to the traditions and customary laws of Negeri Sembilan. This announcement came after a special session of the Dewan Keadilan dan Undang (DKU) chaired by Yang di-Pertuan Besar of Negri Sembilan Tuanku Muhriz advised the Luak of Sungei Ujong to accept Mubarak's removal, in which the Ibu Soko (matriarchal clan leaders) of the Klana Hulu and Anak Waris Klana Hulu of Sungei Ujong were also in attendance.

On 20 April at the Balai Undang Luak Sungei Ujong, Mubarak and the other three Undangs (Undang of Jelebu Dato' Haji Maarof bin Mat Rashad, Undang of Johol Dato' Haji Muhammed bin Abdullah, and Undang of Rembau Dato' Haji Abdul Rahim Yasin) declared the removal of Tuanku Muhriz over claims of alleged misconduct and named Tunku Nadzaruddin, the Tunku Panglima of Negeri Sembilan and the third son of the 10th Yang di-Pertuan Besar Tuanku Ja'afar, as the 12th Yang di-Pertuan Besar. Aminuddin rejected the declaration on the grounds that Mubarak, who signed and read the declaration, no longer held any authority as Undang, having not received the mandate from the Ibu Soko Klana Hulu and Anak Waris Klana Hulu. On the following day, the four Undang claimed that Mubarak's removal was not valid as the DKU members who were present during the special session did not make a decision on the matter and that the other three Undang did not agree with Mubarak's removal. On 30 April, Mubarak was ordered to vacate the official residence of the Undang of Sungei Ujong.

On 05 May 2026, 29-year-old accountant Muhammad Faris Johari, the second child of Johari Meor Ngah and Ibu Soko Klana Hulu Shazlina Dato' Sinda Maharaja Haji Abd Karim, was appointed as the 11th Undang of Sungei Ujong. Faris' appointment was rejected by the Datuk-Datuk Lembaga Adat Sungei Ujong due to the appointment of an Undang of Sungei Ujong requires the unanimous consent of all Ibu Soko of both the Waris Klana Hulu and Waris Klana Hilir lineages, as well as the unanimous approval of all legitimate Datuk-Datuk Lembaga Adat Sungei Ujong, and that the official declaration must be made by the Datuk Shahbandar of Sungei Ujong. They added that Orang Kaya Datuk Laksamana Shaharumzaman Abdul Malek and Datuk Andulika Mandulika Tua Lembaga Waris di-Darat Zainol Ariffin, who released the official statement and the confirmation of Faris' appointment, respectively, have both been previously sacked by the DKU and pledged their support to Mubarak as the legitimate Undang of Sungei Ujong. Five days later, 70-year-old former clerk Abd Rahman was also appointed as the 11th Undang of Sungei Ujong, which was reportedly agreed by the Ibu Soko, Buapak and Tiang Balai Perut Waris Hulu. However, no official statement was issued to announce Abd Rahman's appointment.

On 05 June, Tunku Nadzaruddin was proclaimed as the 12th Yang di-Pertuan Besar by Undang of Jelebu Maarof Mat Rashad, who represented the other three Undangs, at Park Royal A'Famosa Resort, Melaka. The ceremony took place after police obstructed Tunku Nadzaruddin from leaving the resort to head to the Tunku Besar Tampin official residence for the ceremony. Immediately after, Prime Minister Anwar Ibrahim announced that the federal government still recognises Tuanku Muhriz as the rightful Yang di-Pertuan Besar and that constitutional disputes must be resolved through lawful and established channels.

The constitutional crisis triggered the state election when Negeri Sembilan Menteri Besar Dato' Aminuddin Harun announced the dissolution of Negeri Sembilan State Legislative Assembly.

On 27 June 2026, Muhammad Faris Johari is approved and recognised by the Yang di-Pertuan Besar of Negri Sembilan Tuanku Muhriz as the 11th Undang of Luak Sungai Ujong, with effect from 05 May 2026, and effectively removed Mubarak bin Thahak from his posts as 10th Undang of Luak Sungai Ujong.

== Personal life ==
Mubarak Dohak married Noor Hashimah binti Abu Bakar on 31 March 1984. They have three daughters and two sons.

Mubarak Dohak represented his school in the rugby team. The King George V Secondary School rugby team emerged as champions among Negeri Sembilan schools in the under 15 and under 20 categories. Besides rugby, Mubarak Dohak is also keen towards badminton and volleyball. He is also a member of the UMNO Youth Football Team.

== Title and styles ==
Styles of Mubarak bin Dohak
- Reference style: His Grace
- Spoken style: Your Grace

- 1993–2025: His Grace Dato' Klana Petra Dato' Mubarak bin Dohak, 16th Undang of Sungei Ujong
