= Hassan Ab Hamid =

22nd Undang of Rembau

Hassan Ab Hamid حسن عبد الحميد
- His Grace; The Dato' Sedia Raja
- Hassan in 2026

22nd Undang of Rembau
- Reign: 27 June 2026 – present (4 months and 3 days)
- Kerjan: 27 June 2026
- Predecessor: Abd Rahim Yassin
- Born: Hassan bin Ab Hamid; 11 January 1959 (age 67); Rembau, Negeri Sembilan, Federation of Malaya (now Malaysia)
- Spouse: Asmah binti Yaakob (m. 1985)
- Issue: 5
- House: Waris Biduanda
- Religion: Sunni Islam
- Occupation: Teacher
- Education: Institut Pendidikan Guru Raja Melewar (Dip)

Hassan bin Ab Hamid (Jawi: حسن بن عبد الحميد; born 11 January 1959) is a Malaysian teacher who served as the 22nd Undang of Rembau, one of the traditional domains (luak) of Negeri Sembilan, Malaysia. He was installed on 27 June 2026. On 27 June 2026, his appointment was officially presented at the Istana Besar Seri Menanti, in the presence of Tuanku Muhriz. He also served as the Penyandang Pesaka Buapak Kampung Tanjung bergelar Dato' Kaya Maharaja from 1998 until 2024 and the Penyandang Pesaka Dato' Perba briefly in 2024.

== Early life and education ==
Hassan bin Ab Hamid was born on 11 January 1959 in Rembau, Negeri Sembilan, Federation of Malaya (now Malaysia). He received his Diploma in Teaching from the Institut Pendidikan Guru Raja Melewar.

== Teaching career ==
Hassan is a former teacher who began his service in 1984 and retired in 2017. His final posting before retirement was as the Senior Assistant of Student Affairs at Astana Raja Primary School in Rembau, Negeri Sembilan from 2015 to 2017.

== Personal life ==
Hassan is married to Asma bin Yaakob on 1985 and they have 5 children.

== Title and styles ==
Styles of Hassan bin Ab Hamid
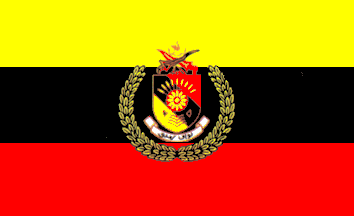
- Reference style: His Grace
- Spoken style: Your Grace

- 1959–1998: Hassan bin Ab Hamid
- 1998–2024: Dato' Kaya Maharaja Hassan bin Ab Hamid
- 2024: Dato' Perba Hassan bin Ab Hamid
- 2024–2026: Hassan bin Ab Hamid
- 2026–present: His Grace Dato' Sedia Raja Dato' Hassan bin Ab Hamid, 22nd Undang of Rembau

== Honours ==
=== Honours of Malaysia ===
- Negeri Sembilan
  - Recipient of Darjah Tertinggi Negeri Sembilan (DTNS) – Dato' (2026)

== See also ==
- 2026 Negeri Sembilan constitutional crisis
- Muhammad Faris Johari (Undang of Sungai Ujong)
- Azrin Khairi (Undang of Jelebu)
- Muhammed Abdullah (Undang of Johol)
