= Muhriz of Negeri Sembilan =

Yang di-Pertuan Besar of Negeri Sembilan since 2008

Muhriz محرز
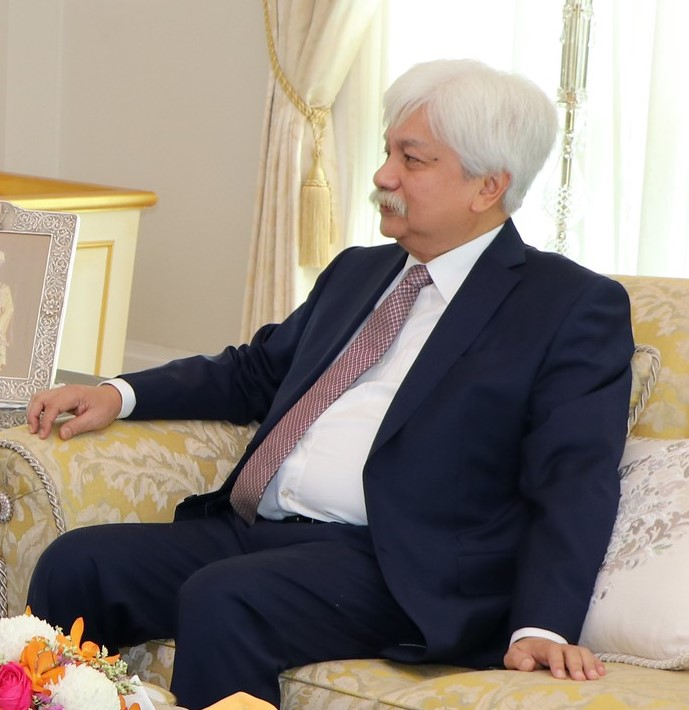
- Muhriz in 2018

Yang di-Pertuan Besar of Negeri Sembilan
- Reign: 29 December 2008 – present
- Installation: 26 October 2009
- Predecessor: Tuanku Ja'afar
- Contender: Tunku Nadzaruddin (since 19 April 2026)
- Menteri Besar: Mohamad Hasan; Aminuddin Harun; Ismail Lasim

8th Tunku Besar of Seri Menanti
- Tenure: 26 December 1961 – 29 December 2008
- Predecessor: Tunku Besar Burhanuddin
- Successor: Tunku Ali Redhauddin

3rd Chancellor of the National University of Malaysia
- Tenure: 16 April 2009 – present
- Predecessor: Tuanku Ja'afar

Chairman of the Regency Council of Negeri Sembilan
- Term: 26 October 1966 – 17 November 1966
- Predecessor: Munawir
- Successor: Munawir
- Born: 14 January 1948 (age 78); Istana Seri Menanti, Negeri Sembilan, Malayan Union
- Spouse: Tuanku Aishah Rohani (m. 1974)
- Issue: 3 (including Tunku Ali Redhauddin)
Names
- Tunku Muhriz ibni Tunku Munawir
Regnal name
- Tuanku Muhriz ibni Almarhum Tuanku Munawir
- House: Pagaruyung
- Father: Tuanku Munawir ibni Almarhum Tuanku Abdul Rahman
- Mother: Tunku Ampuan Durah binti Tunku Besar Burhanuddin
- Religion: Sunni Islam
- Military career
- Allegiance: Malaysia
- Branch: Royal Signal Regiment; Royal Electrical and Mechanical Engineers Corps
- Rank: Colonel in Chief

Tuanku Muhriz ibni Almarhum Tuanku Munawir (Jawi: توانكو محرز ابن المرحوم توانكو مناور ; born 14 January 1948) has been the 11th and current Yang di-Pertuan Besar of Negeri Sembilan since December 2008. He is the only son out of six siblings of royal spouse, the 9th Yang di-Pertuan Besar of Negeri Sembilan Tuanku Munawir and his spouse, Tunku Ampuan Durah.

== Early life and education ==
Tunku Muhriz is the only son out of six children of Tuanku Munawir ibni Almarhum Tuanku Abdul Rahman, the Yang di-Pertuan Besar of Negeri Sembilan from 1960 to 1967, and of his consort, Tunku Ampuan Durah binti Almarhum Tunku Besar Burhanuddin.

Born in 1948, Tunku Muhriz received his primary and secondary education Tuanku Muhammad School, Kuala Pilah and the Tunku Besar School in Tampin, the King George V School in Seremban, Negeri Sembilan and later at the Aldenham School in the United Kingdom. Tunku Muhriz obtained a degree in law (LLB) from the University College of Wales at Aberystwyth.

== Early career ==
Tunku Muhriz began his career in an international bank in Malaysia and became a director and shareholder of a company licensed as brokers in interbank foreign exchange and in the currency deposits market (1973–1986). He was the chairman and shareholder of a Malaysian joint venture with a worldwide advertising agency (1981–1992), chairman and director of a joint venture company involved in the manufacturing of building products (1995–1998) and a director and shareholder of a company engaged in electrical engineering and construction (1995–present). He has been on the board of directors of Bangkok Bank since 2006.

== Tunku Besar of Seri Menanti (1961–2008) ==
Tuanku Muhriz was made Tunku Besar of Seri Menanti (the highest ranked of the Putera Yang Empat) in 1961, following the death of his grandfather Tunku Besar Burhanuddin.

Tuanku Muhriz was first in the order of succession before the death of Tuanku Munawir, followed by Tunku Nasir Alam (the Tunku Laksamana), Tunku Ja'afar (the Tunku Muda Serting) and Tunku Abdullah (the Tunku Panglima Besar). When Tuanku Munawir died in 1967, Tuanku Muhriz was not chosen. Instead the council chose his half-uncle Tuanku Jaafar ibni Almarhum Tuanku Abdul Rahman, a diplomat. It has been suggested that the then Prime Minister of Malaysia, Tunku Abdul Rahman, influenced the Undangs not to choose Tuanku Muhriz on account of his youth (he was then only nineteen).

The Negeri Sembilan Constitution states that the Undangs should elect a suitable and competent ruler first from the sons of the deceased ruler, followed in order from the brothers, then paternal uncles, grandsons, brothers' sons, and paternal uncles' sons of the deceased ruler.

== Yang di-Pertuan Besar (2008–present) ==
=== 2008 Yang di-Pertuan Besar of Negeri Sembilan election ===
Tuanku Muhriz (wearing the white mask), Tuanku Aishah Rohani (his left side), Muhammed Abdullah (his right side) and Tunku Syed Razman watching the funeral of Tunku Ampuan Najihah on 8 September 2023. Behind Tuanku Muhriz, there were Tunku Nadzaruddin, talking with a group of people and Tunku Zain Al-'Abidin (yawning).

On 29 December 2008, the Council of Undang proclaimed him as the 11th Yang di-Pertuan Besar of Negeri Sembilan succeeding Tuanku Ja'afar who had died on 27 December 2008. Many prominent Malaysians backed Tuanku Muhriz to succeed as the Ruler of Negeri Sembilan in view of his modest and dignified personality and by the fact that he had a successful corporate career. He was also the rightful heir, by tradition, to the throne on the death of his father.

Due to having kept a low profile, Tuanku Muhriz was largely unknown outside royal circles in Negeri Sembilan. However, Tuanku Muhriz was not an underdog in the negotiations that was played out for the position of Yang di-Pertuan Besar. During the closed discussions to elect the successor to Tuanku Ja'afar, at least two, if not all four of the Undangs strongly championed his candidacy. They refused to budge when it was suggested that they consider Tunku Naquiyuddin, Tuanku Ja'afar's eldest son, instead as the next Ruler of Negeri Sembilan.

Throughout his life Tuanku Muhriz established and maintained strong ties with the Undangs, the general nobility, the lesser royalty and people of Negeri Sembilan, and more so since moving back to the state. He also has powerful backers within the political establishment in the state, with the former Menteri Besar Tan Sri Mohd Isa Abdul Samad among his supporters.

His supporters at both state and federal levels have promoted him as a well-spoken, well-educated man—someone with the character to move past the disappointment of not being appointed Ruler of the state in 1967.

His supporters said that in contrast to members of Tuanku Ja'afar's family, Tuanku Muhriz shuns publicity and though he can be very progressive in his outlook, he seems more rooted in traditional ways. Tuanku Ja'afar's family were said to be completely devastated with the decision of the Undangs to select Tuanku Muhriz over Tunku Naquiyuddin. They too had several powerful politicians in their camp but the Undangs were not to be swayed.

=== 2026 Negeri Sembilan constitutional crisis ===
On 19 April 2026 at the Balai Undang Luak Sungei Ujong, the Undang Yang Empat announced the removal of Tuanku Muhriz due to alleged misconduct and named Tunku Nadzaruddin, the Tunku Panglima Besar of Negeri Sembilan and the third son of Tuanku Ja'afar, as the 12th Yang di-Pertuan Besar. However, the Negeri Sembilan state government rejected the declaration as Dato' Mubarak Dohak, who signed and read the declaration, had no authority as Undang of Sungei Ujong after he was removed from the position effective 13 May 2025 for 33 alleged offences of the traditions and customary laws. On the following day, the four Undang claimed that Mubarak's removal was not valid as the DKU members who were present during the special session did not make a decision on the matter and that the other three Undang did not agree with Mubarak's removal. On the following month, two individuals, 29-year-old accountant Muhammad Faris Johari and 70-year-old former clerk Abd Rahman, were appointed as the 11th undang of Sungei Ujong. Muhammad Faris's appointment was officially announced whereas Abd Rahman's was not. Both appointments were respectively disputed.

On 27 April, 14 assemblymen from UMNO withdrew their support to Menteri Besar Dato' Seri Aminuddin Harun of the Pakatan Harapan coalition, citing that Aminuddin did not consult UMNO over the dispute between the Undang and Tuanku Muhriz. Negeri Sembilan UMNO later announced that they have accepted Perikatan Nasional's collaboration and have a simple majority to form the state government. Aminuddin said that he was informed by Tuanku Muhriz to continue his duty as Menteri Besar until there is resolution over the matter. Prime Minister Anwar Ibrahim reaffirmed Tuanku Muhriz's stance after being granted an audience and also said that a state snap election is unlikely to happen. On 30 April, the 14 UMNO assemblymen reaffirmed their support for Aminuddin to ensure political stability. However, the state assembly was dissolved on 5 June with the consent of Tuanku Muhriz. This led to a snap election won by UMNO-PAS.

On the same day, Tunku Nadzaruddin was proclaimed as the 12th Yang di-Pertuan Besar by Undang Luak Jelebu Maarof Mat Rashad, who represented the other three Undang, at Park Royal A'Famosa Resort, Malacca. The ceremony took place after police obstructed Tunku Nadzaruddin from leaving the resort to head to the Tunku Besar Tampin official residence for the ceremony. Immediately after, Anwar announced that the federal government still recognises Tuanku Muhriz as Yang di-Pertuan Besar and that constitutional disputes must be resolved through lawful and established channels. The Comptroller of the Royal Household later declared that the proclamation of Tunku Nadzaruddin as illegal and that his title of Tunku Panglima Besar has been relinquished for his attempt to accept an illegal title.

On 16 September, the Negeri Sembilan state executive council, chaired by new Menteri Besar Dato' Ismail Lasim, officially announced the dethronement of Tuanku Muhriz as the Yang di-Pertuan Besar and recognised Tunku Nadzaruddin as the new ruler. The Dewan Keadilan dan Undang (DKU) rejected the removal as unconstitutional and void, and the state secretary office refused to gazette or take any action to implement a proclamation seeking to remove Tuanku Muhriz from the throne after accepting advice from the Attorney General’s Chambers. On 21 September, Tuanku Muhriz revoked the appointments of the state executive council with immediate effect for violating their oath of office for the agreement of removing Tuanku Muhriz from office. Ismail countered that any action to terminate an executive council member without the Menteri Besar's advice is unconstitutional. The revocation of the state executive council was gazetted on 24 September. On the following day, the disputed Undangs announced that the Conference of Rulers (Majlis Raja-Raja) was informed of Tunku Nadzaruddin ascension to the throne. On 20 October, Tunku Nadzaruddin issued his first public statement since his alleged ascension to the throne in a joint statement with the disputed Undangs, declaring that the issue of the customs and the throne was settled with the removal of Tuanku Muhriz according to the Negeri Sembilan constitution. They also declare that Tuanku Muhriz's decree of revoking the ten state executive councillors were invalid and unconstitutional.

On 14 November, Ismail confirmed that he and the ten revoked state executive councillors had withdrawn the dethronement letter and pledged his support to Tuanku Muhriz as the rightful ruler. Ismail said that the decision was made in consideration of the Conference of Rulers' statement on 14 October and the Seremban High Court order dated 5 June, which affirmed Tuanku Muhriz's position as Yang di-Pertuan Besar. Two days later, Ismail resigned as Menteri Besar.

== Colonel in Chief ==
Yang di-Pertuan Besar of Negeri Sembilan Tuanku Muhriz is the Colonel in Chief of Royal Signal Regiment (Malaysia) and Corps of Royal Electrical and Mechanical Engineers (Malaysia).

== Marriage and issue ==
On 16 February 1973, the royal engagement between the Tunku Besar of Seri Menanti Tunku Muhriz who was 25 years old and the Terengganu princess Tengku Aishah Rohani, took place at the Istana Terengganu in Jalan Pekeliling, Kuala Lumpur. At the time, Tunku Muhriz was working as a junior administrative bank officer at Bank Rakyat whilst Tengku Aishah Rohani was a clerk at a local bank.

On 25 April 1974, he married Tengku Aishah Rohani. Their royal marriage was held at the Istana Maziah, Kuala Terengganu and was witnessed by Tunku Muhriz's mother, Yang Maha Mulia Tuanku Ampuan Durah along with other members of the Negeri Sembilan and Terengganu royal family. On 4 May 1974, Yang Maha Mulia Tuanku Ampuan Durah held a royal couples' traditional departure ceremony (istiadat keberangkatan pulang pengantin diraja) at the Istana Lama Seri Menanti.

Tuanku Muhriz is married to Terengganu princess Tengku Aishah Rohani and the royal couple have three sons: Tunku Ali Redhauddin, Tunku Zain Al-'Abidin and Tunku Alif Hussein Saifuddin Al-Amin.

- His Highness Tunku Besar of Seri Menanti Tunku Ali Redhauddin was born on 26 April 1977 at University Hospital, Kuala Lumpur.
- His Highness Tunku Panglima Besar Tunku Zain Al-'Abidin was born on 6 July 1982 at University Hospital, Kuala Lumpur.
- His Highness Tunku Alif Hussein Saifuddin Al-Amin was born on 3 September 1984 with lack of Vitamin K on his brain. He died on 15 January 2016 at Hospital Canselor Tuanku Muhriz following an illness. He was 31 years old. He was buried at the Seri Menanti Royal Mausoleum in Kuala Pilah.

== Styles and titles ==
Styles of Tuanku Muhriz
- Reference style: His Royal Highness
- Spoken style: Your Royal Highness
- Alternative style: Tuanku

- 14 January 1948 – 4 April 1960: His Highness Tunku Muhriz ibni Tunku Munawir
- 5 April 1960 – 5 July 1961: His Highness Tunku Muhriz ibni Tuanku Munawir
- 6 July 1961 – 14 April 1967: His Highness Tunku Muhriz ibni Tuanku Munawir, Tunku Besar of Seri Menanti
- 15 April 1967 – 28 December 2009: His Highness Tunku Muhriz ibni Almarhum Tuanku Munawir, Tunku Besar of Seri Menanti
- 29 December 2009 – present: His Royal Highness Tuanku Muhriz ibni Almarhum Tuanku Munawir, Yang di-Pertuan Besar of Negeri Sembilan

The style of Tuanku Muhriz is:

His Royal Highness Tuanku Muhriz ibni Almarhum Tuanku Munawir, Yang di-Pertuan Besar of Negeri Sembilan

== Honours and awards ==
=== Honours ===
- Negeri Sembilan
  - Grand Master of the Royal Family Order of Negeri Sembilan (since 29 December 2008)
  - Member of the Royal Family Order of Negeri Sembilan (25 February 2009)
  - Grand Master of the Order of Negeri Sembilan (since 29 December 2008)
  - Grand Master of the Royal Family Order of Yam Tuan Radin Sunnah (since 29 December 2008)
  - Grand Master of the Order of Loyalty to Negeri Sembilan (since 29 December 2008)
  - Founding Grand Master of the Order of Loyalty to Tuanku Muhriz (since 14 January 2010)
  - Recipient of the Distinguished Conduct Medal (PPT)
  - Recipient of the Tuanku Muhriz Installation Medal (26 October 2009)

=== Malaysia ===
- Malaysia
  - Recipient of the Order of the Crown of the Realm (DMN) (2009)
  - Recipient of the 10th Yang di-Pertuan Agong Installation Medal (22 September 1994)
  - Recipient of the 14th Yang di-Pertuan Agong Installation Medal (11 April 2012)
  - Recipient of the 15th Yang di-Pertuan Agong Installation Medal (24 April 2017)
  - Recipient of the 17th Yang di-Pertuan Agong Installation Medal (20 July 2024)
- Johor
  - First Class of the Royal Family Order of Johor (DK I)
- Kedah
  - Member of the Royal Family Order of Kedah (DK) (13 May 2010)
- Kelantan
  - Recipient of the Royal Family Order of Kelantan or Star of Yunus (DK) (23 March 2010)
- Perak
  - Recipient of the Royal Family Order of Perak (DK) (5 March 2009)
- Perlis
  - Recipient of the Perlis Family Order of the Gallant Prince Syed Putra Jamalullail (DK)
  - Recipient of Tuanku Syed Sirajuddin Jamalullail Silver Jubilee Medal (2025)
- Selangor
  - First Class of the Royal Family Order of Selangor (DK I) (11 December 2009)
- Terengganu
  - Member first class of the Family Order of Terengganu (DK I)

=== Places named after him ===
- Hospital Canselor Tuanku Muhriz UKM (HCTM), a specialist university hospital located in Jalan Yaacob Latif, Bandar Tun Razak, Cheras, Kuala Lumpur.

== See also ==
- 2026 Negeri Sembilan constitutional crisis

Regnal titles
Preceded by Tuanku Ja'afar	Yang di-Pertuan Besar of Negeri Sembilan; 2008–present	Succeeded by Incumbent
