= Azrin Khairi =

17th Undang of Jelebu

Azrin Khairi عزرين خيري
- His Grace; The Dato' Mendika Menteri Akhirulzaman

17th Undang of Jelebu
- Reign: 27 August 2026 – present (1 month and 28 days)
- Kerjan: 27 August 2026
- Predecessor: Maarof Mat Rashad
- Born: Azrin bin Khairi; 1 January 1975 (age 51); Jelebu, Negeri Sembilan, Malaysia
- Spouse: Norazizan binti Mamat
- House: Suku Biduanda Waris Berundang (Perut Gabai / Perut Ulu Jelebu)
- Religion: Sunni Islam
- Occupation: Corporate figure
- Education: Universiti Kebangsaan Malaysia (BBA, MBA); Open University Malaysia (DBA)

Azrin bin Khairi (Jawi: عزرين بن خيري; born 1975) is a Malaysian corporate figure who served as the 17th Undang of Jelebu, one of the traditional domains (luak) of Negeri Sembilan, Malaysia. He was installed on 27 August 2026. On 14 October 2026, his appointment was officially presented at the Istana Besar Seri Menanti, in the presence of Tuanku Muhriz.

== Early life and education ==
Azrin bin Khairi was born on 1975 in Jelebu, Negeri Sembilan, Malaysia. He received his Bachelor of Business Administration (BBA) and Master of Business Administration (MBA) from the Universiti Kebangsaan Malaysia (UKM). He also had the Doctor of Business Administration (DBA) from the Open University Malaysia (OUM).

== Personal life ==
Azrin is married to Norazizan binti Mamat.

== Title and styles ==
Styles of Azrin bin Khairi
- Reference style: His Grace
- Spoken style: Your Grace

- 1975–2026: Azrin bin Khairi
- 2026–present: His Grace Dato' Mendika Menteri Akhirulzaman Dato' Azrin bin Khairi, 17th Undang of Jelebu

== Honours ==
=== Honours of Malaysia ===
- Pahang
  - Knight Companion of the Order of the Crown of Pahang (DIMP) – Dato' (2012)
- Negeri Sembilan
  - Recipient of Darjah Tertinggi Negeri Sembilan (DTNS) – Dato' (2026)

== See also ==
- 2026 Negeri Sembilan constitutional crisis
- Muhammad Faris Johari (Undang of Sungai Ujong)
- Muhammed Abdullah (Undang of Johol)
- Hassan Ab Hamid (Undang of Rembau)
