= Wahab (name) =

Wahab is a surname and a masculine given name. People with the name include:

== Surname ==
- A. Wahab, acting regent of Poso Regency, Central Sulawesi, Indonesia
- Adewale Wahab, Nigerian footballer
- Anisa Wahab, Afghan actress and singer
- Bakri Wahab, Indonesian politician
- Fauzia Wahab, Pakistani politician
- Hamal Wahab, Pakistani cricketer
- Mamta Wahab, Bangladeshi politician
- Murtaza Wahab, Pakistani politician
- Musa Wahab, Malaysian statesman
- Qudus Wahab, Nigerian professional basketball player
- Shaista Wahab, American Dari-language writer
- Wahib Wahab, Indonesian statesman
- Zarina Wahab, Indian actress

== Given name ==
- Wahab Ackwei, Ghanaian football player
- Wahab Adams, Ghanaian professional footballer
- Wahab Adegbenro, Nigerian physician and statesman
- Wahab Akbar, Filipino politician
- Wahab Chaudhary, Indian politician from Uttar Pradesh
- Wahab Dolah, Malaysian politician
- Wahab Dosunmu, Nigerian politician
- Wahab Goodluck, Nigerian politician
- Wahab Khar, Kashmiri Sufi mystic poet and saint
- Wahab Riaz, Pakistani cricketer
- Wahab Shinwari, Afghan cricketer

== See also ==
- Abdul Wahab
- Wahb
