= Ngitung =

Indonesian military officer and politician

Ngitung was the fifth regent of Poso Regency, Central Sulawesi, Indonesia, who ruled from 1960 to 1962. He succeeded A. Wahab, the acting regent during the vacancy.

Alongside his military background, he was notable for advancing Poso Regency beyond that of the city of Palu, the capital of the province.
