= Musa Wahab =

- His Grace; The Dato' Mendika Menteri Akhirulzaman

Undang of Jelebu
- Tenure: 4 February 1980 - 11 September 2014
- Coronation: 20 November 1981
- Predecessor: Abu Bakar Ma’amor
- Successor: Maarof Mat Rashad
- Born: September 4, 1937; Jelebu, Negeri Sembilan, Federated Malay States (now Malaysia)
- Died: September 11, 2014 (aged 77); Hospital Tuanku Jaafar, Seremban, Negeri Sembilan, Malaysia
- Burial: September 12, 2014; Peradong, Jelebu, Negeri Sembilan, Malaysia
- Spouse: Manoriah Ahmad Bidawi
- House: Sarin (Kuala Jelebu)
- Father: Wahab bin Rah
- Mother: Hajjah Aminah binti Othman
- Religion: Islam
- Occupation: Teacher/school principal (prior to appointment as Undang)

Musa bin Wahab (4 September 1937 in Kuala Klawang, Jelebu - 11 September 2014 in ]Seremban) was the 15th Undang of Jelebu, one of the traditional s domains (luak) of Negeri Sembilan, Malaysia. He was elected as Undang on 4 February 1980 and installed 20 November 1981 according to the customs of the state. He was of the noble house of Waris Sarin lineage; the other noble lineages of Jelebu are Waris Ulu Jelebu and Waris Kemin.

YTM Dato' Hj. Musa married To' Puan Manoriah binti Ahmad Bidawi on 30 September 1961, and had three sons and two adopted daughters. He worked most of his life as a teacher, and served as the principal of Sekolah Menengah Kebangsaan, in Port Dickson and then Sekolah Menengah Undang Jelebu, Kuala Klawang, Jelebu. He retired from teaching on 4 February 1980 the day the then Dato' Menteri Sah Mangku Alam Raja Sari Othman bin Baginda officially declared him the 15th Undang of Jelebu. YTM Dato' Hj. Musa had also been actively involved in politics as a member of the UMNO.
