= Suki Low =

Suki Low 劉紓妤
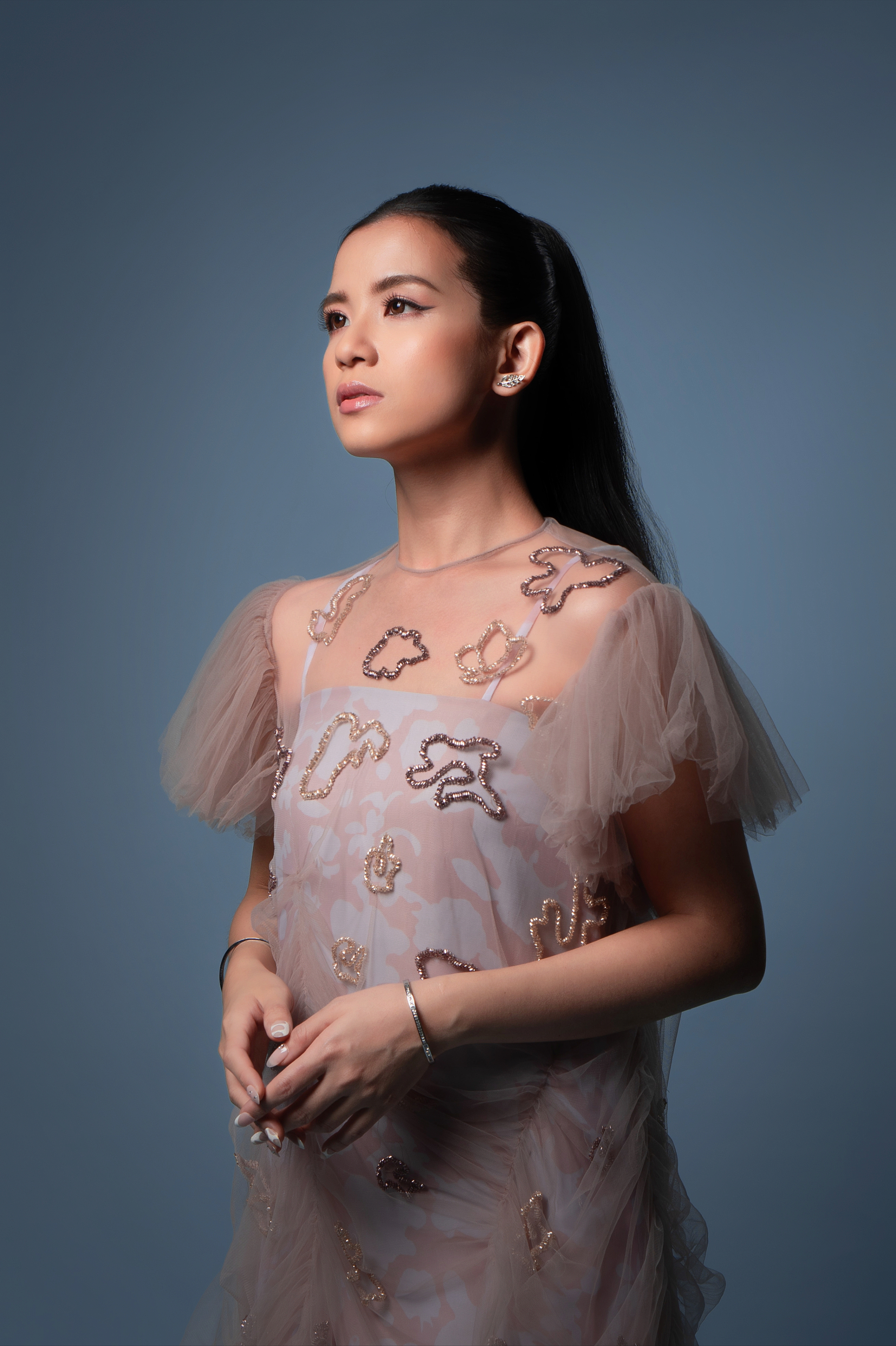
- Suki Low in 2023

Background information
- Also known as: Suki Low
- Born: Low Sook Yee; 26 December 1990 (age 35); Seremban, Malaysia
- Genre: Pop
- Occupation: Singer
- Website: Official Facebook Fanpage; Official Fan Club – Supersukis; Recording Label – Monkey Bone; Artiste Management

Suki Low

Chinese name
- Traditional Chinese: 劉紓妤
Transcriptions
Standard Mandarin
- Hanyu Pinyin: Liú Shúyu
Yue: Cantonese
- Jyutping: Lau4 Syu1 Jyu4
Southern Min
- Hokkien POJ: Lâu Su-î
- Tâi-lô: Lâu Su-î

Low Sook Yee (Chinese: 劉紓妤; pinyin: Liú Shúyu; Jyutping: Lau4 Syu1 Jyu4; Pe̍h-ōe-jī: Lâu Su-î; born 26 December 1990) or popularly known as Suki Low is a Malaysian singer. She won Malaysia's first ever reality singing competition that offers a one million ringgit prize to the winner. To date (July 2008), she has released one full album, Finally | Akhirnya, under the Monkey Bone label.

== Biography ==
Suki is a Malaysian Chinese who hails from Seremban, the capital of Negeri Sembilan. She was 16 years old at the time of her victory.

Her former secondary schools are SMK Methodist (ACS), Seremban (Form 1 to 3) and SMK King George V, Seremban (Form 4 and 5).

She was married to her manager Jeremy Chong on 12 December 2012 and gave birth to her eldest son Ethan Chong on 1 December 2014.

=== One in a Million ===
Suki was a favourite to win, ranking higher than professional singer Dayang Nurfaizah after the tests. She was eliminated during the knockout round, but returned by popular vote during the Second Chance stage.

Throughout the competition, Suki sang:

- Mobile – Avril Lavigne (Top 20)
- I'm With You – Avril Lavigne (Second Chance)
- Underneath Your Clothes – Shakira (Top 12)
- You Oughtta Know – Alanis Morissette (Top 10)
- Behind These Hazel Eyes – Kelly Clarkson (Top 9)
- Pasangan Yang Tepat – Marshanda (Top 8)
- Inside Your Heaven – Carrie Underwood (Top 7)
- When It Falls Apart – The Veronicas (Top 6)
- Pudar – Rossa (Top 6)
- Kaulah Segalanya – Ruth Sahanaya (Top 5)
- Cepat-cepat – Jaclyn Victor (Top 5)
- Mimpi Pun Sama – Sarah (Top 4)
- Permata Pemotong Permata – Ella (Top 4 – Duet with Ella)
- Losing Grip – Avril Lavigne (Top 3)
- Seindah Biasa – Siti Nurhaliza (Top 3)
- Berdiri – Original composition (Grand Finale)
- Everything – M2M (Grand Finale)

At its grand finale on 22 September 2006, she garnered 39% of the votes with her rendition of the songs, Berdiri and Everything. She ousted Muhammad Alif bin Mohd Satar and Ahmad Faizal Tahir who had 27% and 34% of the votes respectively.

In 2007, Suki is appointed the Brand Ambassador of Pepsi Malaysia along with the runner-up of OIAM 2006, Faizal Tahir.

Her debut album is entitled "Finally | Akhirnya".

“Finally | Akhirnya" contains 11 tracks which had the touch from various composer such as Kieran Kuek, Audi Mok, Luke Mason, Anton Morgan, Nine of Ruffedge Trilink and Zaf to name a few. This album brings the concept of pop rock to all the music lovers out there.

== See also ==
- One in a Million
- SMK King George V

Preceded by None	One in a Million; Winner; Season 1 (2006)	Succeeded by Norayu binti Damit
