= Aminuddin Harun =

Malaysian politician

Yang Berhormat Dato' Seri Utama Haji Aminuddin Harun SUNS MP
- أمين الدين هارون
- Aminuddin Harun in 2026

8th Menteri Besar of Negeri Sembilan
- In office 12 May 2018 – 2 August 2026
- Monarch: Muhriz
- Preceded by: Mohamad Hasan
- Succeeded by: Ismail Lasim
- Constituency: Sikamat

Vice President of the People's Justice Party
- Incumbent
- Assumed office 17 July 2022 Serving with: Amirudin Shari &; Chang Lih Kang &; Nik Nazmi Nik Ahmad (2022–2025) &; Awang Husaini Sahari &; Nurul Izzah Anwar (2022–2025) &; Saraswathy Kandasami &; Ramanan Ramakrishnan (since 2025)
- President: Anwar Ibrahim

State Chairman of the Pakatan Harapan of Negeri Sembilan
- Incumbent
- Assumed office 30 August 2017
- President: Wan Azizah Wan Ismail
- National Chairman: Mahathir Mohamad (2017–2020); Anwar Ibrahim (since 2020)
- Preceded by: Position established

State Chairman of the People's Justice Party of Negeri Sembilan
- Incumbent
- Assumed office 2014
- President: Wan Azizah Wan Ismail (2014–2018); Anwar Ibrahim (since 2018)
- Deputy: Ravi Munusamy
- Preceded by: Kamarul Baharin Abbas

Division Chief of the People's Justice Party of Port Dickson
- Incumbent
- Assumed office 17 July 2022
- President: Anwar Ibrahim
- Preceded by: Ravi Munusamy

Division Chief of the People's Justice Party of Tampin
- In office 17 November 2018 – 17 July 2022
- President: Anwar Ibrahim
- Preceded by: Zulkapli Kassim
- Succeeded by: Abdul Shukor Ab Aziz

Member of the Malaysian Parliament for Port Dickson
- Incumbent
- Assumed office 19 November 2022
- Preceded by: Anwar Ibrahim (PH–PKR)
- Majority: 23,601 (2022)

Member of the Negeri Sembilan State Legislative Assembly for Sikamat
- In office 8 March 2008 – 1 August 2026
- Preceded by: Md Yusop Harmain Shah (BN–UMNO)
- Succeeded by: Razali Abu Samah (PN–WAWASAN)
- Majority: 499 (2008); 510 (2013); 3,413 (2018); 2,662 (2023)

Faction represented in Dewan Rakyat
- 2022–: Pakatan Harapan

Faction represented in the Negeri Sembilan State Legislative Assembly
- 2008–2018: People's Justice Party
- 2018–2026: Pakatan Harapan

Personal details
- Born: Aminuddin bin Harun; 2 January 1968 (age 58) Kampung Pachitan, Port Dickson, Negeri Sembilan, Malaysia
- Citizenship: Malaysia
- Party: United Malays National Organisation (UMNO) (–1998); People's Justice Party (PKR) (since 1999)
- Other political affiliations: Barisan Nasional (BN) (–1998); Barisan Alternatif (BA) (1999–2004); Pakatan Rakyat (PR) (2008–2015); Pakatan Harapan (PH) (since 2015)
- Spouse: Wan Hasni Wan Yusof
- Children: 5
- Education: MARA Institute of Technology
- Occupation: Politician
- Nickname: Tok Min

Aminuddin bin Harun (Jawi: أمين الدين بن هارون; born 2 January 1968), familiarly known as Tok Min, is a Malaysian politician who has served as the Member of Parliament (MP) for Port Dickson since November 2022. He served as the eighth Menteri Besar of Negeri Sembilan from May 2018 to August 2026 and Member of the Negeri Sembilan State Legislative Assembly (MLA) for Sikamat from March 2008 to August 2026. He is a member of the People's Justice Party (PKR), a component party of the Pakatan Harapan (PH) and formerly Pakatan Rakyat (PR) coalitions. He has also served as a Vice President of PKR and Division Chief of PKR of Port Dickson since July 2022, State Chairman of PH of Negeri Sembilan since August 2017 as well as State Chairman of PKR of Negeri Sembilan since 2014. He served as the Division Chief of PKR of Tampin from November 2018 to July 2022.

== Early life and education ==
Aminuddin bin Harun was born on 2 January 1968 in Kampung Pachitan, near Chuah in Port Dickson. He received his secondary education at Sekolah Menengah Kebangsaan Tanah Merah, Port Dickson before furthering his studies at the MARA Institute of Technology (now UiTM) in the field of business.

== Early career ==
From 1991, Aminuddin served a five-year tenure as an investigative officer in the Anti-Corruption Agency (ACA, now MACC). In 1995, he joined Golden Hope Furniture Sdn. Bhd. as head of production management and later MCIS Safety Glass (M) Sdn Bhd as Senior Executive from 1996 to 2008 as head of the sales department, management committee, internal investigation panel and ISO/TS 16949:2002 auditor.

== Political career ==
Prior to joining keADILan (later the People's Justice Party or PKR) in 1999, he was a member of UMNO and was its Division Secretary of Kampung Pachitan from 1995 to 1998 and the Division Youth Secretary of Jimah from 1997 to 1998.

After the 2018 Negeri Sembilan state election, Aminuddin submitted a letter by PKR President Wan Azizah Wan Ismail to Yang di-Pertuan Besar of Negeri Sembilan Tuanku Muhriz, endorsing him as the next Menteri Besar of Negeri Sembilan for the first term and to form a new Negeri Sembilan state government after Pakatan Harapan won the election by gaining the simple majority in the Negeri Sembilan State Legislative Assembly. Three days after the election, Aminuddin was appointed and sworn in as the Menteri Besar of Negeri Sembilan at Istana Besar in Seri Menanti, Kuala Pilah.

In the 2022 general election, Aminuddin was elected for the MP for Port Dickson. In the 2022 PKR party election, he was elected as Vice President with 33,230 votes, the fourth-highest number of votes among the vice presidential candidates.

In the 2023 Negeri Sembilan state election, Aminuddin was reappointed and sworn in again as the Menteri Besar for the second term by winning the election again by securing the supermajority in the State Legislative Assembly with Barisan Nasional (BN). He formed a coalition state government with BN by appointing State Chairman of BN of Negeri Sembilan Jalaluddin Alias as the Senior Exco Member, a position equal to a Deputy Menteri Besar, effectively making him the second most powerful person in the state government as well as three other BN MLAs as Exco Members.

=== 2026 Negeri Sembilan constitutional and political crisis ===
On 17 April 2026, Aminuddin announced that Dato' Haji Mubarak bin Dohak was removed from his office as Undang of Sungei Ujong, with effect from 13 May 2025, for 33 alleged offences relating to traditional and customary laws. This announcement came after a special session of the Hall of Justices and Undangs (Dewan Keadilan dan Undang, DKU) chaired by Yang di-Pertuan Besar of Negeri Sembilan, Tuanku Muhriz advised the Luak of Sungei Ujong to accept Mubarak's removal, in which the Klana Hulu of Sungei Ujong's Clan Matriarch (Ibu Suku) and her immediate family (Anak Waris) were also in attendance.

On 20 April at the Balai Undang Luak Sungei Ujong, Dato' Mubarak and the other three Undangs, namely Dato' Hj. Maarof bin Mat Rashad of Jelebu; Dato' Hj. Muhammed bin Abdullah of Johol; and Dato' Hj. Abdul Rahim bin Yasin of Rembau declared the removal of Tuanku Muhriz on claims of alleged misconduct and named Tunku Nadzaruddin, the Tunku Panglima of Negeri Sembilan and third son of Muhriz's predecessor Tuanku Ja'afar, as the 12th Yang di-Pertuan Besar. Aminuddin rejected the declaration on the grounds that Dato’ Haji Mubarak, who signed and read the declaration, no longer held any authority as Undang having not received the mandate from the Klana Hulu's Clan Matriarch and her family. On the following day, the four Undangs claimed that Mubarak's removal was not valid as the DKU members who were present during the special session did not make a decision on the matter and that the other three Undangs did not agree with Mubarak's removal. On the following month, two individuals, 29-year-old accountant Muhammad Faris Johari and 70-year-old former clerk Abd Rahman, were appointed as the 11th Undang of Sungei Ujong. Muhammad Faris' appointment was officially announced whereas Abd Rahman's was not. Both appointments were respectively disputed.

On 27 April, UMNO withdrew their support to Aminuddin, citing that he did not consult UMNO over the dispute between the Undangs and Muhriz. Negeri Sembilan UMNO later announced that they have accepted Perikatan Nasional's collaboration and have a simple majority to form a new state government. Aminuddin said that he was informed by Tuanku Muhriz to continue his duty as Menteri Besar until there is resolution over the matter. Prime Minister Anwar Ibrahim reaffirmed Tuanku Muhriz's stance after being granted an audience and also said that a state snap election is unlikely to happen. On 30 April, the 14 UMNO assemblymen reaffirmed their support to Aminuddin to ensure political stability. However, the state assembly was dissolved on 5 June with the consent of Tuanku Muhriz.

On the same day, Tunku Nadzaruddin was proclaimed as the 12th Yang di-Pertuan Besar by Undang Luak Jelebu Maarof Mat Rashad, who represented the other three Undangs, at Park Royal A'Famosa Resort, Melaka. The ceremony took place after police obstructed Tunku Nadzaruddin from leaving the resort to head to the Tuanku Besar Tampin official residence for the ceremony. Immediately after, Anwar announced that the federal government still recognises Tuanku Muhriz as the rightful Yang di-Pertuan Besar and that constitutional disputes must be resolved through lawful and established channels.

== Election results ==
Negeri Sembilan State Legislative Assembly
Year	Constituency	Candidate	Votes	Pct	Opponent(s)	Votes	Pct	Ballots cast	Majority	Turnout
2008	N13 Sikamat	Aminuddin Harun (PKR)	6,036	51.02%	Md Yusop Harmain Shah (UMNO)	5,537	46.80%	11,830	499	76.37%
2013	N13 Sikamat	Aminuddin Harun (PKR)	8,584	50.63%	Wan Salwati Abdullah (UMNO)	8,074	47.62%	16,954	510	86.30%
2018	N13 Sikamat	Aminuddin Harun (PKR)	9,832	55.87%	Syamsul Amri Ismail (UMNO)	6,419	36.48%	17,858	3,413	85.90%
2018	N13 Sikamat	Aminuddin Harun (PKR)	9,832	55.87%	Rahim Yusof (PAS)	1,331	7.56%	17,858	3,413	85.90%
2018	N13 Sikamat	Aminuddin Harun (PKR)	9,832	55.87%	Bujang Abu (IND)	15	0.10%	17,858	3,413	85.90%
2023	N13 Sikamat	Aminuddin Harun (PKR)	12,730	54.82%	Ahmad Raihan Muhamad Hilal (BERSATU)	10,068	43.36%	23,220	2,662	71.79%
2023	N13 Sikamat	Aminuddin Harun (PKR)	12,730	54.82%	Mohammed Hafiz Baharudin (IND)	339	1.46%	23,220	2,662	71.79%
2023	N13 Sikamat	Aminuddin Harun (PKR)	12,730	54.82%	Bujang Abu (IND)	83	0.36%	23,220	2,662	71.79%
2026	N32 Linggi	Aminuddin Harun (PKR)	6,163	39.27%	Mohd Faizal Ramli (UMNO)	9,139	58.24%	15,693	2,976	75.90%
2026	N32 Linggi	Aminuddin Harun (PKR)	6,163	39.27%	Zamri Md Said (BERSATU)	391	2.49%	15,693	2,976	75.90%

Parliament of Malaysia
Year	Constituency	Candidate	Votes	Pct	Opponent(s)	Votes	Pct	Ballots cast	Majority	Turnout
2022	P132 Port Dickson	Aminuddin Harun (PKR)	42,013	52.40%	Kamalanathan Panchanathan (MIC)	18,412	22.96%	80,185	23,601	76.7%
2022	P132 Port Dickson	Aminuddin Harun (PKR)	42,013	52.40%	Rafei Mustapha (PAS)	18,235	22.74%	80,185	23,601	76.7%
2022	P132 Port Dickson	Aminuddin Harun (PKR)	42,013	52.40%	Ahmad Idham Ahmad Nazri (PEJUANG)	1,084	1.35%	80,185	23,601	76.7%
2022	P132 Port Dickson	Aminuddin Harun (PKR)	42,013	52.40%	Abdul Rani Kulup Abdullah (IND)	441	0.55%	80,185	23,601	76.7%

== Honours ==
=== Honours of Malaysia ===
- Malaysia
  - Recipient of the 17th Yang di-Pertuan Agong Installation Medal (2024)
- Negeri Sembilan
  - Principal Grand Knight of the Order of Loyalty to Negeri Sembilan (SUNS) – Dato' Seri Utama (2024)
  - Knight Grand Companion of the Order of Loyalty to Negeri Sembilan (SSNS) – Dato' Seri (2019)

== See also ==
- Sikamat (state constituency)

Political offices
Preceded by Mohamad Hasan	11th Menteri Besar of Negeri Sembilan; 2018–present	Incumbent
