= King George V School, Seremban =

SMK King George V
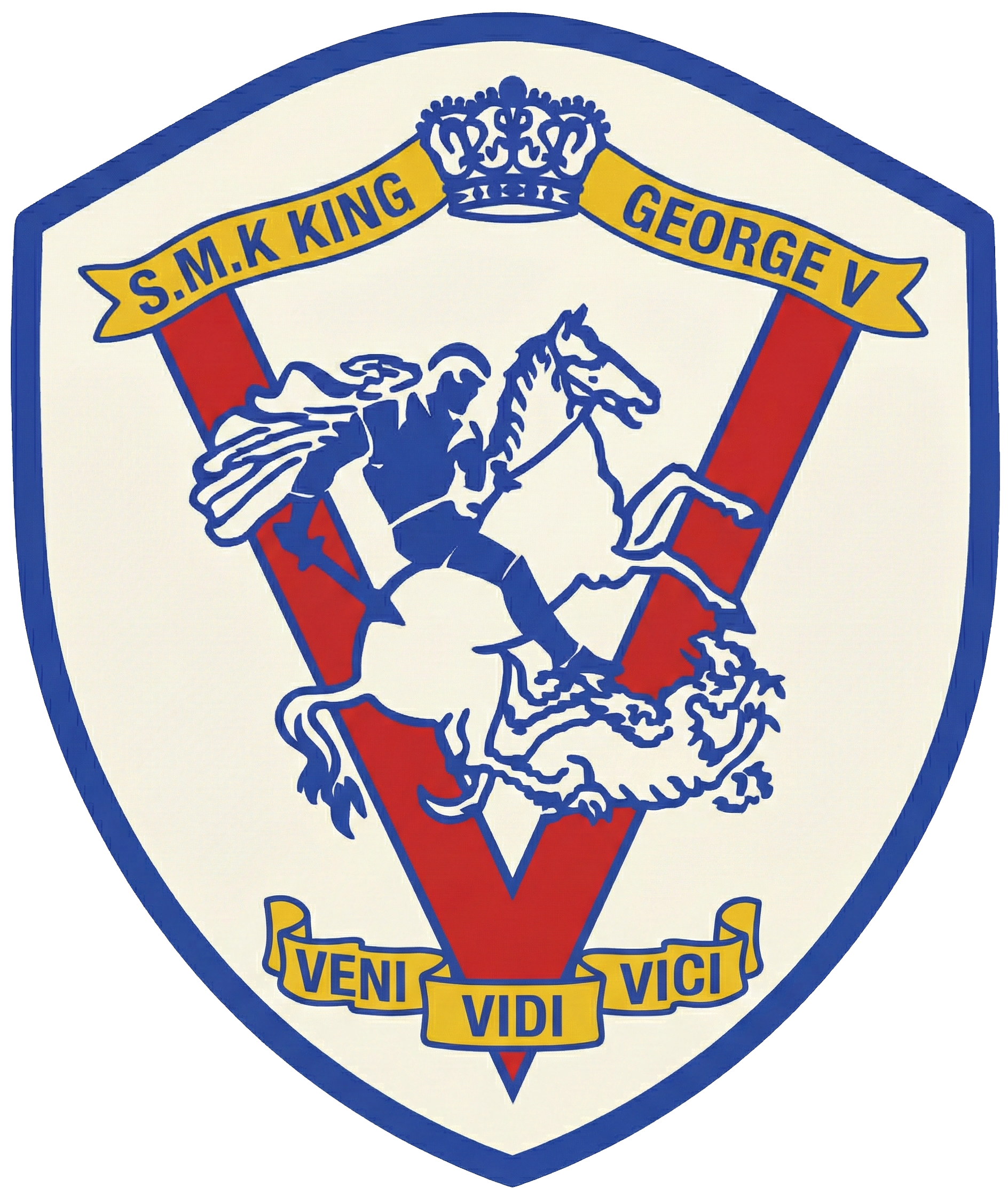
- The official school crest of SMK King George V
- Seremban, Negeri Sembilan; Malaysia

Information
- Type: National Secondary School
- Motto: Veni, Vidi, Vici (I came, I saw, I conquered)
- Established: 15 January 1923 (103 years ago)
- Category: Cluster School of Excellence, High Performance School (SBT)
- Principal: Shahril bin Sabudin
- Grades: Form 1 – Form 6 (Pre-University)
- Yearbook: The Georgian
- Abbreviation: SMK KGV
- Website: smkkgv-official.blogspot.com

King George V Secondary School (Malay: Sekolah Menengah Kebangsaan King George V; abbreviated as SMK KGV) is a daily secondary school located in Seremban, Negeri Sembilan. Established on 15 January 1923, it is one of Malaysia's oldest educational institutions and holds the dual status of a High Performing School (SBT) and a Cluster School of Excellence. Due to its significant historical importance and colonial architecture, SMK KGV was officially gazetted as a National Heritage site under the National Heritage Act 2005.

Throughout more than a century since its founding, SMK KGV has been renowned for its consistent tradition of academic and extracurricular excellence. The school has produced numerous national leaders, professionals, and intellectuals collectively known as "Georgians." Its Latin motto is Veni, Vidi, Vici (I Came, I Saw, I Conquered).

== History ==
SMK King George V: A Glimpse into the Past

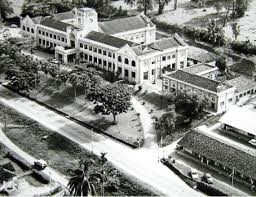
The iconic main administrative block.

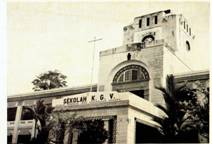
Architectural detail of the colonial-era facade.

=== Early establishment (1923–1927) ===
The school was originally established as the Government-aided English School (also known as GES) on 15 January 1923. In its early stages, the school did not have its own building and operated temporarily in a store building at the Sungai Ujong Railway Station in Seremban, Negeri Sembilan.

The first Headmaster was Chin Meow Cheong, who led a teaching staff of nine with an initial enrollment of 125 students. Due to its location at the railway station, the school timetable at the time was uniquely structured according to the train schedules to accommodate students commuting from rural areas.

=== Relocation to Bukit Hose and official opening (1928) ===
The transformation from GES to KGV officially began on 7 October 1926, with the construction of a new building block on a hill site at Hose Road (now Jalan Za'aba). This main building was completed in late 1927 at a total cost of $221,337.82.

On 23 April 1928, the building was officially inaugurated by the Secretary of State for the Colonies, W.G. Ormsby-Gore. The grand ceremony was attended by several high-ranking dignitaries, including:

- HRH Tuanku Muhammad ibni al-Marhum Tuanku Antah (The Yang di-Pertuan Besar of Negeri Sembilan).
- Sir Hugh Clifford (High Commissioner for the Federated Malay States and Governor of the Straits Settlements).
- Sir R.O. Winstedt (Director of Education for the Federated Malay States).
- Mr. Wolffe (British Resident of Negeri Sembilan).
- J.M. Meade (Inspector of Schools).

The school was named after the reigning British monarch at the time, King George V. The date of the inauguration also coincided with the celebration of Saint George's Day.

=== World War II era (1941–1945) ===
In 1941, during World War II, the school building was requisitioned as a base and headquarters by the Australian Army. This forced students to be temporarily relocated to the Negeri Sembilan Club and the Malay Club on Lemon Road (now Jalan Tuanku Munawir).

During the Japanese occupation of Malaya, school sessions ceased and the building was turned into the headquarters for the Kempeitai (Japanese Military Police) for the Seremban district under the command of the Miyazaki Butai Regiment. Immediately following the Surrender of Japan in August 1945, the British Military Administration (BMA) took over the building to be used as a General Military Hospital for six months to treat war victims and Prisoners of War (POWs). After a restoration phase, King George V School officially resumed its educational operations in 1946.

=== Post-Independence era and modern development ===
Following the Independence of Malaya (1957) and the Formation of Malaysia (1963), the school was renamed Sekolah Menengah Kebangsaan King George V. The school is officially recognized by the Ministry of Education as a:

- Cluster School of Excellence (English Language and Rugby)
- High Performance School (Sekolah Berprestasi Tinggi)

In 2023, SMK King George V celebrated its Centenary (100th anniversary), marking a century of contribution to the nation's education and the production of prominent national figures.

== Architectural and facilities uniqueness ==
=== Main block and Clock Tower ===
The most prominent feature of SMK KGV is its main block, which showcases the colonial architecture style of Public Works Department (PWD) Classicism. This 'E'-shaped building features wide corridors (verandahs), high ceilings, and arches specifically designed for the tropical climate. The school's primary landmark is the Clock Tower located at the center of the main block. The clock was specially imported and manufactured by Gillett & Johnston, a renowned firm of clockmakers and bell founders based in Croydon, England.

=== Pedestrian tunnel ===
One of the unique landmarks of SMK King George V is the existence of an underground pedestrian tunnel that connects the main academic block to the school field (Georgian Green). The tunnel, which runs beneath Jalan Za'aba (formerly Hose Road), was built specifically to ensure student safety. This historic infrastructure remains intact, functional, and is actively used by the school community to this day, making it one of the few schools in the country with such a facility.

=== Swimming pool ===
SMK KGV is one of the few daily (non-boarding) schools in Malaysia to have its own swimming pool within the school grounds. The construction of this facility reflects the institution's early vision of balancing academic excellence with sporting development. The facility was officially inaugurated on 23 June 1962 by HRH Tuanku Munawir ibni Almarhum Tuanku Abdul Rahman, the then Yang di-Pertuan Besar of Negeri Sembilan.

=== School field (Georgian Green) ===
Georgian Green is the nickname for the main field of SMK King George V, serving as the heart of sports activities and character building for students. The field is regarded as a "sacred ground" that has witnessed the birth of many sporting champions, particularly in rugby and athletics. Known by the moniker "The Dragons", the school's rugby team is among the most formidable and respected school rugby teams in Malaysia, having won numerous national titles.

== List of principals ==
The following is the chronological list of principals who have served at SMK King George V since its inception in 1923. The transition from British to local leadership in the late 1950s reflects the broader period of Malaysianization in the national education system.

Num.	Name of the principal	Term of service	Num.	Name of the principal	Term of service
1	Mr. Chin Meow Cheong	1923 – 1928	22	Mr. Cheah Cheng Eam	1961
2	Mr. M. Wheatley	1928 – 1929	23	Mr. N.S.R. Bickers	1961 – 1965
3	Mr. E.H. Willson	1929 – 1932	24	Mr. P. Navarathnarajah	1965 – 1968
4	Mr. R.J. Huddie	1932 – 1934	25	Mr. K. Anandarjah	1968 – 1970
5	Mr. F. Cobb	1934	26	Mr. Lim Leng Lee	1970 – 1976
6	Mr. C.A. Scott	1934 – 1935	27	Mr. Ahmad Dahan	1976 – 1980
7	Mr. D. Roper	1935 – 1936	28	Mr. Hashim Jasa	1980 – 1982
8	Mr. O.G. Williams	1936 – 1941	29	Tuan Haji Mohd Zain bin Rais	1982 – 1989
9	Mr. E.M.F. Payne	1941 – 1945	30	Tuan Haji Mohd Taib bin Hussin	1989 – 1995
10	Mr. Chin Meow Cheong	1945 – 1946	31	Tuan Haji Ramlan bin Sulaiman	1995
11	Mr. E.M.F. Payne	1946 – 1948	32	Tuan Haji Mokhtar bin Mentol	1995 – 1996
12	Mr. P.L. Shaw & Mr. L.I. Lewis	1948 – 1949	33	Tuan Haji Madzlan bin Borhan	1996 – 1997
13	Mr. G.P. Dartford	1949 – 1950	34	Mr. Shahidan bin Mokhtar	1997 – 1999
14	Mr. A.L. McCorkindale	1950 – 1952	35	Mr. Samsuddin bin Hamidan	1999 – 2007
15	Mr. Sutcliffe	1952 – 1955	36	Tuan Haji Zakaria bin Mohd Zin	2007 – 2012
16	Mr. S. Thambiah	1955 – 1956	37	Tuan Haji Mohd bin Md Isa	2012 – 2017
17	Mr. P. Gunaratnam	1956	38	Tuan Haji Mohd Razib bin Jamaludin	2017 – 2020
18	Mr. J.E.B. Ambrose	1956 – 1957	39	Tuan Haji Roslin bin Balia	2020 – 2021
19	Mr. W.V. Hobson	1957 – 1958	40	Tuan Haji Ezaiddin bin Hussain	2021 – 2024
20	Mr. R. Vivekananda	1958 – 1961	41	Dr. Mohd Fadzil bin Jamil	2024
21	Mr. Tan Seng Chye	1961	42	Tuan Haji Murad bin Nordin	2024 – 2026
			43	Dr. Haji Shahril bin Sabudin	2026 - now

== School identity ==
=== Vision and mission ===
As a school under the auspices of the Ministry of Education, KGV upholds the national educational aspirations designed to produce a competitive and holistic generation.

- Vision: Quality Education, Educated Individuals, A Prosperous Nation.
- Mission: Upholding a Quality Education System to Develop Individual Potential to Fulfill National Aspirations.

=== National Education Philosophy ===
The school is committed to realizing the National Education Philosophy (Falsafah Pendidikan Kebangsaan) to produce individuals who are balanced in terms of intellectual, spiritual, emotional, and physical (JERI) aspects, based on firm belief in and devotion to God.

=== Motto and tagline ===
The school motto is in Latin, adapted from the famous expression by the Roman leader Julius Caesar:

- Motto: Veni, Vidi, Vici (I came, I saw, I conquered)
- Tagline: Georgians: The Pinnacle of Excellence

=== School badge ===
The badge of SMK King George V has undergone several evolutionary phases since its inception. Historically, the badge was directly inspired by two figures:

1. King George V (George Ernest Frederick Albert Windsor): The reigning monarch of the British Empire when the school was founded. The school's name and specific elements on the badge serve as a tribute to him.
2. St. George (George of Lydda): The image of a mounted knight defeating a dragon is an adaptation of the iconography of St. George. This symbol was chosen because the school's official opening date falls on 23 April, which coincides with Saint George's Day in England.

==== Symbolic meaning ====
===== Colours =====
The primary colors of the badge — royal blue, off-white, and scarlet red — symbolize the historical link between the school and the British Empire, derived directly from the colors of the Union Jack. The color golden yellow represents unwavering loyalty to the institution of the Malay Rulers.

===== Visual elements =====
There are three main components of the badge design:

- The Knight and the Dragon: Depicts a mounted warrior defeating a dragon, serving as a metaphor for good always triumphing over evil.
- The Crown: Located at the top of the badge as a symbol of sovereignty and a sign of absolute loyalty to the Crown/Monarchy.
- Roman Numeral 'V': Represents the number five (5), referring to King George V.

==== Design evolution ====
Evolution of the SMK King George V Badge

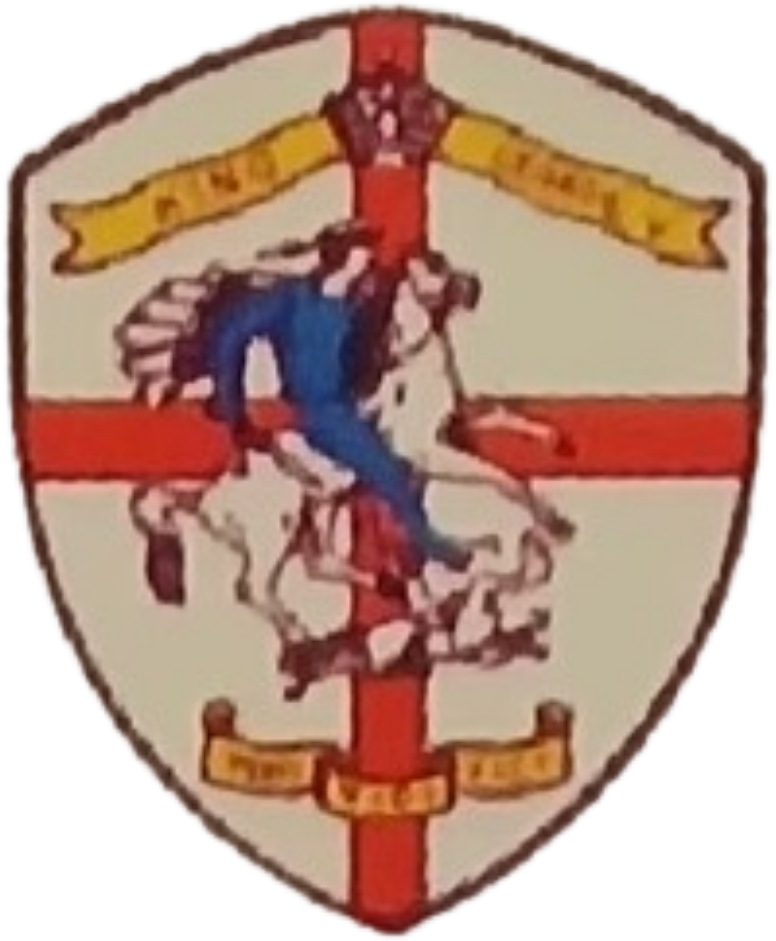
The early badge featuring the cross symbol.

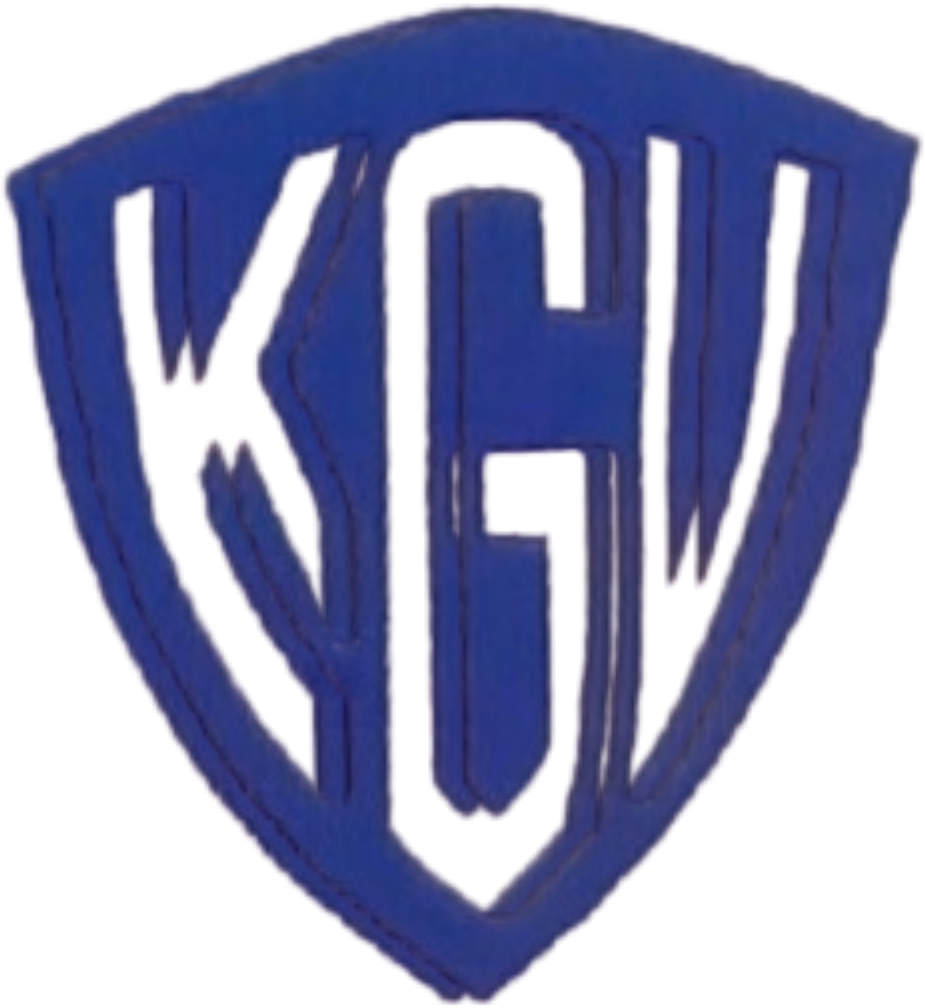
The simplified version of the badge previously used.

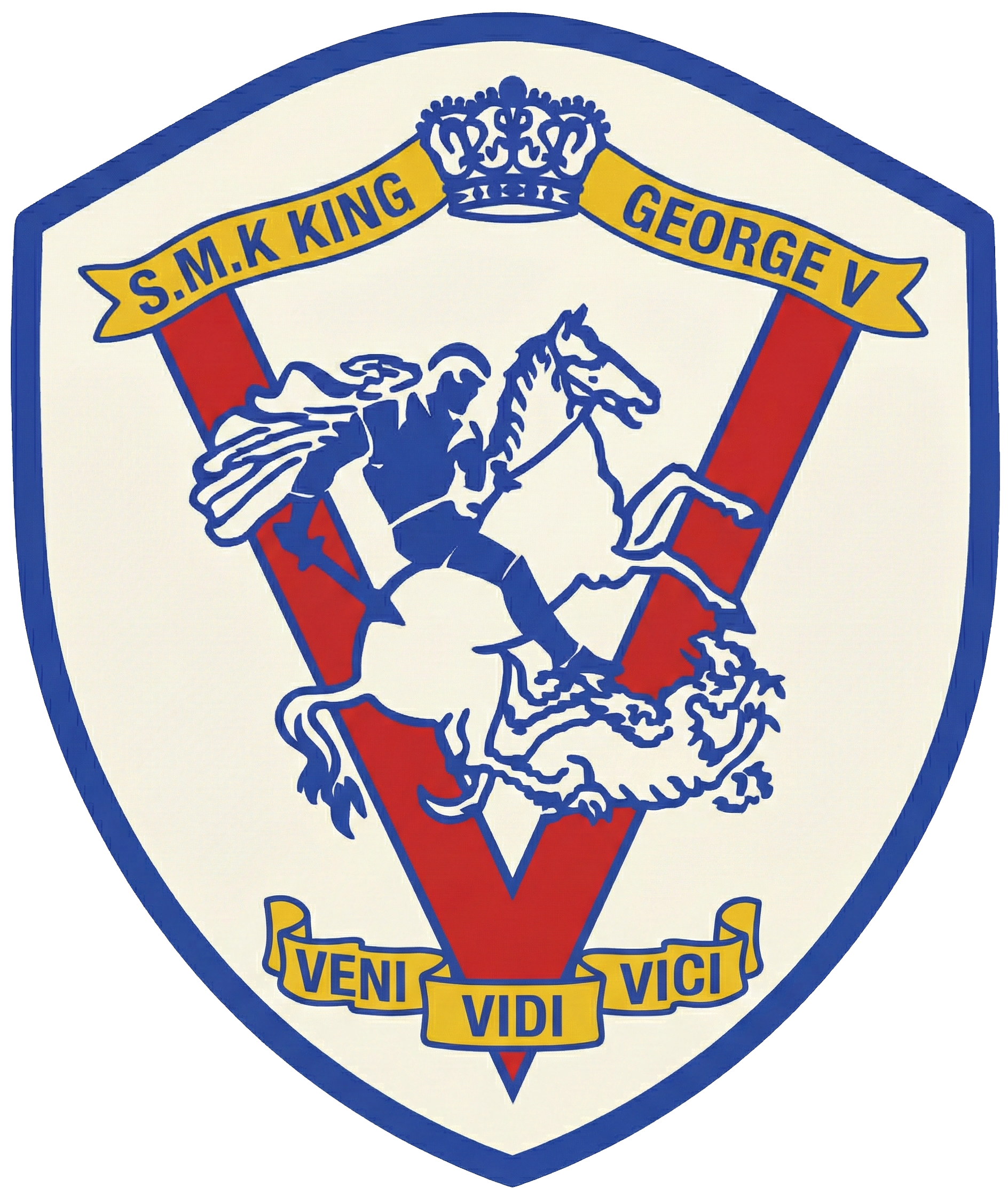
Latest badge
- The Cross Controversy: The early design of the badge caused controversy due to the inclusion of the Saint George's Cross from the Flag of England. To align with local sensitivities, the badge was eventually modified.
- Simplified Version: Following the controversy, the badge was changed to a simpler design without the knight and dragon imagery. However, this version was eventually deemed too plain and failed to reflect the school's strong historical identity.
- Current Design: The school eventually returned to the original design featuring the mounted knight. However, the cross symbol was replaced with the letter 'V' to represent King George V.

=== School song ===
The SMK King George V school song is sung in English, reflecting its long history and tradition as one of the premier schools in Malaysia.

We Georgians faithfully shall serve
Our King and Country
On land and sea wherever Georgians be
We proudly fly the school banner high
Our school brings joy no words
Can tell how we honour thee

United we are together or apart
Forever contributing ideas to progress
Sing our school song
Brings memory so sweet
With gratitude so deep we hail thee
Sing our school song
Brings memory so sweet
With gratitude so deep we hail thee

We Georgians faithfully shall serve
Our King and country till eternity

== Notable alumni ==
Former students of SMK King George V, Seremban are affectionately known as Old Georgians and serve as the cornerstones of the school's legacy of excellence. Notable alumni include:

Leadership and Governance
No.	Name	Primary Position / Role
1	Muhriz of Negeri Sembilan	The 11th Yang di-Pertuan Besar of Negeri Sembilan
2	Mubarak Dohak	The 11th Ruling Chief (Undang Luak) of Sungai Ujong
3	Razman Tunku Syed Idrus Al Qadri	The 8th Tunku Besar of Tampin
4	Tunku Nadzaruddin	Pretender of Yang di-Pertuan Besar of Negeri Sembilan
5	Abdul Malek bin Yusuf	First Menteri Besar of Negeri Sembilan and the 2nd Yang di-Pertua Negeri of Malacca
6	Fong Chan Onn	Former Minister of Human Resources
7	Fauziah Mohd Taib	Former Ambassador of Malaysia to the Netherlands
8	Hamdan Adnan	Former Commissioner of the SUHAKAM
9	Zakaria bin Nordin	Former Member of the State Legislative Assembly (ADUN Ampangan)
10	Ng Chin Chai	Secretary-General of the Badminton Association of Malaysia (BAM)
11	Badrul Shah Norman	Director of the MACC (Sarawak Branch)
12	Mohd Taufek Ismail	Former Director of the National Bureau of Investigation (now MACC) for Kedah & Perlis (1974–1976)
13	Azam Baki	Chief Commissioner of the Malaysian Anti-Corruption Commission (MACC)
14	Utama Hashim Aman	7th Chief Secretary to the Government (1982–1984)
15	Mohammed Najeeb Abdullah	Former Member of the Dewan Negara (Senate) (2010–2013)
16	Mohamad Ayob Abu Hassan	Former Advisor at Affin Hwang Asset Management Sdn Bhd
17	Aziyah Mohamed	Former Deputy Secretary-General, Ministry of Natural Resources and Environment
18	P. Alagendra	Former Chief Police Officer of Selangor (1977–1984) and Olympian
19	Mohd Rashdan Haji Baba	First Vice-Chancellor of Universiti Putra Malaysia (UPM)
20	Hamzah Sendut	First Vice-Chancellor of Universiti Sains Malaysia (USM)

Arts, Sports, and Other Achievements
No.	Name	Notable Achievements / Contributions
1	Suki Low Sook Yee	Winner of the first season of the reality show One in a Million
2	Shuhaimi Baba	Renowned film director and recipient of multiple national art awards
3	Punch Gunalan	National Badminton legend and world-class athlete
4	Norlidar Saidi	RTM broadcasting pioneer and veteran actress
5	Fadilah Mansor	Prolific veteran actress in the Malaysian film and drama industry
6	Abdul Latiff Haji Mohidin	Celebrated national artist and poet (ALMA)
7	P. Alagendra	Olympic Hockey athlete representing Malaysia
8	Sheikh Ali Sheikh Mohamed	Olympian (Hockey) in the 1956 Melbourne Olympic Games
9	Salina Yusoff	SEA Games Gold medalist (Cycling) at the 1985 Bangkok Games
