= A. Wahab =

Indonesian politician

A. Wahab was the acting regent of Poso Regency, Central Sulawesi, Indonesia; and ran the interim administration from 1959 to 1960. Due to political instability in Indonesia at the time, he was selected because he had a military background.

The interim government led by Wahab only lasted one year, and then he was replaced by Ngitung.
