= Razman al-Qadri =

Tunku Syed Razman Al-Qadri سيد رزمن القدري
- Razman in 2023

Tunku Besar of Tampin
- Reign: 26 December 2005 - present
- Coronation: 26 December 2005
- Predecessor: Tunku Syed 'Idrus al-Qadri
- Born: 14 December 1962 (age 63); Seremban, Negeri Sembilan, Federation of Malaya
- Spouse: Tunku Isteri Sharlita binti Omar; Cik Puan Isteri Anis binti Sobari
- House: Al Qadri
- Father: Tunku Syed 'Idrus al-Qadri
- Mother: Tunku Zainon binti Tunku Sulaiman
- Religion: Islam

Tunku Syed Razman bin Tunku Syed 'Idrus Al-Qadri (Jawi: سيد رزمن بن سيد ال ءادروس القدري, [ʃayyɪd razman bɪn ʃayyɪd ul'-ɪdrus al-qadrɪ]; born 14 December 1962 in Seremban) is a Malaysian royal and the current Tunku Besar (hereditary ruler) of Tampin, in Negeri Sembilan. He is the only son of the previous ruler, Tunku Syed Idrus al-Qadri, and his wife Tunku Zainon binti Tunku Sulaiman. He was declared the heir apparent to the princedom of Tampin at birth. He ascended on the death of his father on 26 December 2005.

Tunku Razman was formally installed as Tunku Besar at Balai Rasmi, in Tampin, on 12 August 2006.

Tuanku Muhriz (wearing the white mask), Tuanku Aishah Rohani (his left side), Muhammed Abdullah (his right side) and Razman al-Qadri watching the funeral of Tunku Ampuan Najihah on 8 September 2023. Behind Tuanku Muhriz, there were Tunku Nadzaruddin, talking with a group of people and Tunku Zain Al-'Abidin (yawning).

He is the patron of the Tunku Syed Razman Environmental Foundation, established in 2010.
