= Attorney General's Chambers of Malaysia =

Malaysia government agency under the Prime Minister's Department

- Jabatan Peguam Negara Malaysia جابتن ڤڬوام نڬارا

Agency overview
- Formed: 1948; 78 years ago
- Jurisdiction: Government of Malaysia
- Headquarters: No. 45, Persiaran Perdana, Precinct 4, Pusat Pentadbiran Kerajaan Persekutuan, 62100 Putrajaya
- Employees: 1,827 (2018)
- Annual budget: MYR 148,892,100 (2018)
- Agency executive: Mohd Dusuki Mokhtar, Attorney General
- Parent agency: Prime Minister's Department (Malaysia)
- Website: www.agc.gov.my

The Attorney General's Chambers of Malaysia (AGC; Malay: Jabatan Peguam Negara Malaysia; Jawi: جابتن ڤڬوام نڬارا) is a Malaysia government agency under the Prime Minister's Department and led by the Attorney General. Established in 1946, it is responsible for acting as legal advisor to the government, handling criminal prosecutions, preparing draft laws, and managing civil cases in which the government is involved.

== History ==
The Attorney General's Chambers of Malaysia began with the role of the Attorney General as the chief legal officer in the country and was later recognized as an official government institution in 1948. The AGC originally had served as a legal advisor to the government, and later became responsible for drafting laws, prosecuting criminal cases, and representing the government in civil and constitutional proceedings.

In 1964, the AGC set up a special translation office to translate law documents and letters in Malay, which is crucial for the usage by the Government, the police and Sharia courts. Since 1980, the AGC has placed under the Prime Minister's Department, reflecting the strategic importance of law in the governance of the country.

In 2024, the AGC and Universiti Teknologi MARA (UiTM) inked a memorandum of understanding to established strategic cooperation for law research, professional training and research.

== Roles and responsibilities ==
The Attorney General of Malaysia is the principal legal advisor to the Government of Malaysia. His roles and responsibilities are provided for in Article 145 of the Federal Constitution.

== See also ==
- Law of Malaysia
- Attorney General of Malaysia
