= Menteri Besar of Negeri Sembilan =

Head of government in the Malaysian state of Negeri Sembilan

- Menteri Besar Negeri Sembilan
- Incumbent; Ismail Lasim since 2 August 2026
- Government of Negeri Sembilan
- Style: Yang Amat Berhormat (The Most Honourable)
- Member of: Negeri Sembilan State Executive Council
- Reports to: Negeri Sembilan State Legislative Assembly
- Residence: Jalan Taman Bunga, 70100 Seremban, Negeri Sembilan
- Seat: Tingkat 5B, Wisma Negeri, 70502 Seremban, Negeri Sembilan
- Appointer: 1. Yang di-Pertuan Besar of Negeri Sembilan; 2. Undang Yang Empat; Undang of Sungai Ujong; Undang of Jelebu; Undang of Johol; Undang of Rembau; 3. Tunku Besar of Tampin
- Term length: 5 years or lesser, renewable once (while commanding the confidence of the Negeri Sembilan State Legislative Assembly With State Elections held no more than five years apart)
- Constituting instrument: The Laws of the Constitution of Negeri Sembilan 1959
- Inaugural holder: Abdul Malek Yusuf
- Formation: 1 February 1948; 78 years ago
- Deputy: Senior Member of the Negeri Sembilan State Executive Council (de facto)
- Website: www.ns.gov.my

The Menteri Besar of Negeri Sembilan or First Minister of Negeri Sembilan is the head of government in the Malaysian state of Negeri Sembilan. According to the convention, the Menteri Besar is the leader of the majority party or largest coalition party of the Negeri Sembilan State Legislative Assembly.

The 12th and incumbent Menteri Besar of Negeri Sembilan is Ismail Lasim, who took office on 2 August 2026.

== Appointment ==
According to the state constitution, the Yang di-Pertuan Besar of Negeri Sembilan with the concurrence of Negeri Ruling Chiefs shall first appoint the Menteri Besar to preside over the Executive Council and requires such Menteri Besar to be:

1. A member of the Legislative Assembly who in his and Negeri Ruling Chiefs' judgment is likely to command the confidence of the majority of the members of the Assembly,
2. An ethnic Malay who professes the religion of Islam, and
3. Not a Malaysian citizen by naturalisation, or by registration under Article 17 of the Federal Constitution

But the Yang di-Pertuan Besar may in his discretion dispense the second requirement and appoints a non-Malay and non-Muslim as the Menteri Besar.

The Yang di-Pertuan Besar and Negeri Ruling Chiefs on the Menteri Besar's advice shall also appoint not more than ten nor less than four members from among the members of the Legislative Assembly.

The member of the Executive Council must take and subscribe in the presence of the Yang di-Pertuan Besar the oath of office and allegiance as well as the oath of secrecy before they can exercise the functions of their office. The Executive Council shall be collectively responsible to the Legislative Assembly. The members of the Executive Council shall not hold any office of profit or engage in any trade, business or profession that will cause conflict of interest.

If a government cannot get its appropriation (budget) legislation passed by the Legislative Assembly, or the Legislative Assembly passes a vote of no confidence in the government, the Menteri Besar is bound by convention to resign immediately. The Yang di-Pertuan Besar's choice of replacement Menteri Besar will be dictated by the circumstances. A member of the Executive Council other than the Menteri Besar shall hold office during the pleasure of the Yang di-Pertuan Besar with the concurrence of Negeri Ruling Chiefs unless the appointment of any member of the Executive Council shall have been revoked by the Yang di-Pertuan Besar on the advice of the Menteri Besar but may at any time resign his office.

Following a resignation in other circumstances, defeat in an election, or the death of the Menteri Besar, the Yang di-Pertuan Besar with the concurrence of Negeri Ruling Chiefs will generally appoint as Menteri Besar the person voted by the governing party as their new leader.

== Powers ==
The power of the Menteri Besar is subject to a number of limitations. A Menteri Besar removed as leader of his or her party, or whose government loses a vote of no confidence in the Legislative Assembly, must advise a state election or resign the office or be dismissed by the Yang di-Pertuan Besar with the concurrence of Negeri Ruling Chiefs. The defeat of a supply bill (one that concerns the spending of money) or unable to pass important policy-related legislation is seen to require the resignation of the government or dissolution of Legislative Assembly, much like a non-confidence vote, since a government that cannot spend money is hamstrung, also called loss of supply.

The Menteri Besar's party will normally have a majority in the Legislative Assembly and party discipline is exceptionally strong in Negeri Sembilan politics, so the passage of the government's legislation through the Legislative Assembly is mostly a formality.

== Caretaker Menteri Besar ==
The legislative assembly unless sooner dissolved by the Yang di-Pertuan Besar with the concurrence of Negeri Ruling Chiefs on the advice of the Menteri Besar, shall continue for five years from the date of its first meeting. The state constitution permits a delay of 60 days of a general election to be held from the date of the dissolution and the legislative assembly shall be summoned to meet on a date not later than 120 days from the date of dissolution. Conventionally, between the dissolution of one legislative assembly and the convening of the next, the Menteri Besar and the executive council remain in office in a caretaker capacity.

== List of Menteris Besar of Negeri Sembilan ==
The following is the list of Menteris Besar of Negeri Sembilan since 1948:

Colour key (for political parties):
UMNO Alliance / Barisan Nasional Pakatan Harapan

No.	Portrait	Name (Birth–Death) Constituency	Term of office			Party (Note: This column names only the Menteri Besar's party. The state government he heads may be a complex coalition of several parties and independents; those are not listed here.)	Election	Assembly
No.	Portrait	Name (Birth–Death) Constituency	Took office	Left office	Time in office	Party	Election	Assembly
1		Abdul Malek Yusuf (1899–1977)	1 February 1948	11 August 1950	2 years, 192 days	UMNO	–	–
2		Mohamad Salleh Sulaiman	11 August 1950	1 January 1951	144 days	UMNO	–	–
3		Abdul Malek Yusuf (1899–1977)	1 August 1951	15 April 1952	259 days	UMNO	–	–
4		Abdul Aziz Abdul Majid (1907–1976)	15 April 1952	1 October 1952	170 days	UMNO	–	–
5		Abdul Malek Yusuf (1899–1977)	1 October 1952	1 October 1953	1 year, 0 days	UMNO	–	–
6		Shamsuddin Naim (1911–1983)	1 October 1953	31 January 1959	5 years, 123 days	Alliance (UMNO)	–	–
7		Mohamad Shariff Abdul Samad	15 April 1959	23 June 1959	70 days	Alliance (UMNO)	–	–
8		Mohamed Said Muhammad (1907–1996); MLA for Linggi	23 June 1959	10 May 1969	9 years, 322 days	Alliance (UMNO)	1959	1st
8		Mohamed Said Muhammad (1907–1996); MLA for Linggi	23 June 1959	10 May 1969	9 years, 322 days	Alliance (UMNO)	1964	2nd
9		Mansor Othman (1923–1999); MLA for Seri Menanti	10 May 1969	12 July 1978	9 years, 64 days	Alliance (UMNO)	1969	3rd
9		Mansor Othman (1923–1999); MLA for Seri Menanti	10 May 1969	12 July 1978	9 years, 64 days	BN (UMNO)	1974	4th
10		Rais Yatim (born 1942); MLA for Pertang	12 July 1978	29 April 1982	3 years, 292 days	BN (UMNO)	1978	5th
11		Mohd Isa Abdul Samad (born 1949); MLA for Linggi	29 April 1982	24 March 2004	21 years, 331 days	BN (UMNO)	1982	6th
11		Mohd Isa Abdul Samad (born 1949); MLA for Linggi	29 April 1982	24 March 2004	21 years, 331 days	BN (UMNO)	1986	7th
11		Mohd Isa Abdul Samad (born 1949); MLA for Linggi	29 April 1982	24 March 2004	21 years, 331 days	BN (UMNO)	1990	8th
11		Mohd Isa Abdul Samad (born 1949); MLA for Linggi	29 April 1982	24 March 2004	21 years, 331 days	BN (UMNO)	1995	9th
11		Mohd Isa Abdul Samad (born 1949); MLA for Linggi	29 April 1982	24 March 2004	21 years, 331 days	BN (UMNO)	1999	10th
12		Mohamad Hasan (born 1956); MLA for Rantau	25 March 2004	11 May 2018	14 years, 48 days	BN (UMNO)	2004	11th
12		Mohamad Hasan (born 1956); MLA for Rantau	25 March 2004	11 May 2018	14 years, 48 days	BN (UMNO)	2008	12th
12		Mohamad Hasan (born 1956); MLA for Rantau	25 March 2004	11 May 2018	14 years, 48 days	BN (UMNO)	2013	13th
13		Aminuddin Harun (born 1968); MLA for Sikamat	12 May 2018	1 August 2026	8 years, 83 days	PH (PKR)	2018	14th
13		Aminuddin Harun (born 1968); MLA for Sikamat	12 May 2018	1 August 2026	8 years, 83 days	PH (PKR)	2023	15th
14		Ismail Lasim (born 1959); MLA for Juasseh	2 August 2026	Incumbent	111 days	BN (UMNO)	2026	16th

== Living former Menteris Besar ==
Name	Term of office	Date of birth
Rais Yatim	1978–1982	16 April 1942 (age 84)
Mohd Isa Abdul Samad	1982–2004	14 November 1949 (age 77)
Mohamad Hasan	2004–2018	2 May 1956 (age 70)
Aminuddin Harun	2018–2026	2 January 1968 (age 58)
