= Undang Yang Empat =

Traditional chieftains of Negeri Sembilan, Malaysia

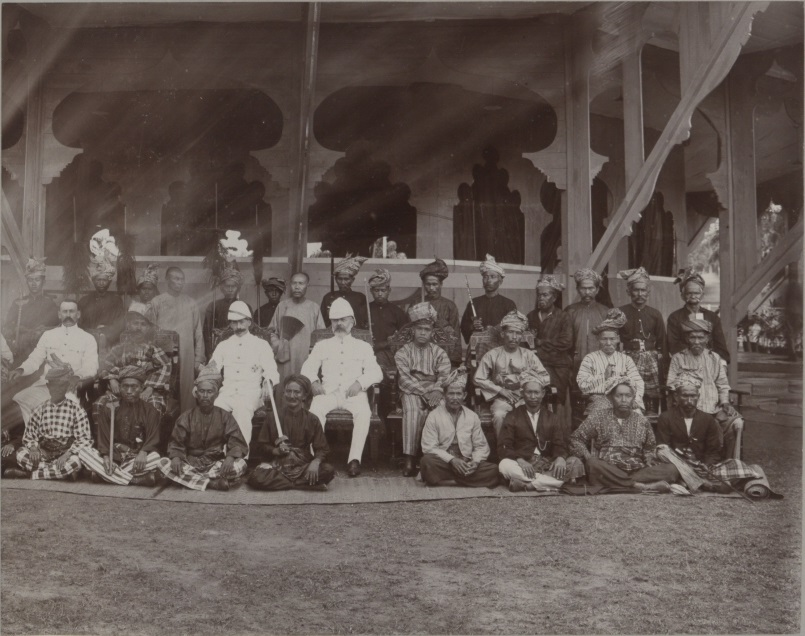
Negeri Sembilan chieftains seated (middle row) with Tuanku Muhammad Shah (second from left), 1903.

The Undang Yang Empat (Negeri Sembilan Malay: Undang Nan Ompek; Jawi: أوندڠ يڠ امڤت) are the ruling chiefs or territorial chiefs who play an important role in the election of a new Yang di-Pertuan Besar of Negeri Sembilan, Malaysia. The Negeri Sembilan State Constitution 1959 states "The Undangs of the territories of Sungai Ujong, Jelebu, Johol and Rembau shall be persons lawfully elected..." Pt.1 Ch.3, XIV (1). The name is believed to be derived from the Malay word undang-undang meaning "law".

Malaysia's modern day constitution confirms the status of the Undang under Article 71, 160, 181 and the Eight Schedule of Federal Constitution as Malay Ruler within the Federation. Undangs are still chosen from amongst certain noble families in the state, the succession being both matrilineal and elective following the Adat Purbakala.

== History ==
Traditional adat domains of Negeri Sembilan

According to E.W. Birch, the Undang Yang Empat trace their history and rank back to the four Batins (Sakai Chiefs) of Johol, Sungei Ujong, Jelebu and Klang, with Rembau later taking the position left vacant by Klang.

R.O. Winstedt described the Undangs as "Territorial Chiefs" and translated as "Law-Givers". He wrote that "Every Undang is the head of the Waris Family" and "the Undang sitting in council with the tribal or tribal and waris chiefs interpreted custom and had powers of execution with the creese." He also concluded that "The British creation of a Council for the Nine States of which the Yam-tuan is president and the Undangs are members put the coping-stone on the Negri Sembilan constitution."

The Minangkabau—who settled in Negeri Sembilan, in present-day Malaysia at the end of the 17th century—were ruled by a "penghulu" or headman who was chosen from the noble families of Sakai and Jakun belonging to the Biduanda clan. These penghulu, notably those of Sungai Ujong, Jelebu, Johol and Rembau became powerful enough to exalt themselves above the other penghulu. These penghulu were later acknowledged by the sultan of the old Johor Empire as sovereign in their own territories. By the early part of the 18th century, the leaders of these four territories started using the title "Undang" to distinguish themselves from the other penghulu luak.

According to the Negeri Sembilan Constitution 1959, Pt.1 Ch.5, XIV (1) states that the Undangs “shall be persons lawfully elected in accordance with the custom of their respective luaks.” Further, the Constitution allows for their termination as “On any of the Undangs vacating or on being removed from office in accordance with the custom of his luak…” Pt.1 Ch.5, XIV (3).

== Duties and roles ==
The Undangs carry out duties such as deputy-heads of state, deputy-heads of Islam as state religion, upholding and safeguarding the special position of Bumiputera in Negeri Sembilan, attending the state opening of the legislative assembly and the election of the Yang di-Pertuan Besar of Negeri Sembilan, who is the head of state of Negeri Sembilan.

In the election of the Head of State, the Negeri Sembilan Constitution 1959 expresses that, (a) There shall be a Yang di-Pertuan Besar "to exercise the functions and powers of a Ruler" [Pt.1 Ch.3, VII (1)], (b) The Yang di-Pertuan Besar shall be "elected by the Undangs of the territories of Sungai Ujong, Jelebu, Johol and Rembau" [Pt.1 Ch.3, VII (2)], and (c) The candidate "shall be a male of the Malay race, of sound mind and professing the religion of the State, who is a lawfully-begotten descendant in the male line of Raja Radin ibni Raja Lenggang" [Pt.1 Ch.3, VII (3)]. The Undangs themselves cannot stand for election.

In their constitutional role, the "Ruling Chiefs" is composed of the four Undangs and the Tengku Besar of Tampin [Pt.2 Ch.1, XXXIV]. The Constitution defines "the expression Ruler... shall mean His Highness and the Ruling Chiefs" [Pt.1 Ch.8, XXVII]. Further to this, "all laws passed by the Legislature shall be... enacted by His Highness and the Ruling Chiefs of Negeri Sembilan..." [Pt.2 Ch.5, LXV].

The Negeri Sembilan Constitution 1959 also defines the role of the Undang as a permanent members of the Dewan Keadilan dan Undangan (KDU) council, whose role is (1) "to advice on questions relating to Malay Custom..." (2) to advice "on on other matters which may be referred to it..." and (3) "to exercise such functions as may be conferred upon it by this Constitution or any other written law." Pt.1 Ch.6, XVI (1). Here, "Malay Custom" includes "the election or succession to or removal from or vacation of office of any of the Ruling Chiefs referred to in Article XIV".

== Inheritance and titles ==
The ruling chiefs are selected among the nobility in each luak (district), following matrilineal inheritance, part of the state's adat perpatih customs.

- The Undang of Sungai Ujong is chosen among the Waris Klana di-Hulu and Waris Klana di-Hilir families of the noble House of Waris Klana and inherits the title Dato' Klana Petra.
- The Undang of Jelebu is elected among the three noble houses of Waris Ulu Jelebu, Waris Sarin and Waris Kemin, and inherits the title Dato' Mendika Menteri Akhirul Zaman.
- The Undang of Johol are a succession of members of two families in the female line of either Perut Johol or Perut Gemencheh. The son of the eldest sister of the incumbent is usually the heir. He inherits the title Dato' Johan Pahlawan Lela Perkasa Setiawan.
- The Undang of Rembau alternates between the two major noble houses in the luak, namely the Waris Jakun (who on accession inherits the title Dato' Lela Maharaja) and the Waris Jawa (Dato' Sedia Raja). As with the Undang of Johol, the son of the eldest sister of the incumbent is the heir in the family.

The senior wife of an Undang has the honorific title of Tok Puan.

== List of current Undang Yang Empat ==
Luak (District)	Title	Undang (Ruler)	Reign	Ref.
Sungei Ujong	Dato' Klana Petra	Dato' Haji Mubarak bin Dohak (10th, claimant)	1993–2025 (disputed)	
Sungei Ujong	Dato' Klana Petra	Dato' Muhammad Faris bin Johari (11th, de jure)	2026–present (disputed)	
Sungei Ujong	Dato' Klana Petra	Abdul Rahman bin Limat (11th, claimant)	2026–present (disputed)	
Jelebu	Dato' Mendika Menteri Akhirulzaman	Dato' Haji Maarof bin Mat Rashad (16th, claimant)	2019–2026 (disputed)	
Jelebu	Dato' Mendika Menteri Akhirulzaman	Dato' Azrin bin Khairi (17th, de jure)	2026–present (disputed)	
Johol	Dato' Johan Pahlawan Lela Perkasa Sitiawan	Dato' Haji Muhammed bin Abdullah	2016–present	
Rembau	Dato' Sedia Raja	Dato' Haji Abd Rahim bin Yassin (21th, claimant)	2024–2026 (disputed)	
Rembau	Dato' Sedia Raja	Dato' Hassan bin Ab Hamid (22th, de jure)	2026–present (disputed)	

== See also ==
- Laws of the Constitution of Negeri Sembilan 1959
- Monarchies of Malaysia
- Yang di-Pertuan Besar of Negeri Sembilan
- 2026 Negeri Sembilan constitutional crisis
