= Maarof Mat Rashad =

Current Dato' Undang Luak of Jelebu

- His Grace; The Dato' Mendika Menteri Akhirulzaman

16th Undang of Jelebu
- Reign: 26 June 2018 - 31 May 2023 (8 years, 4 months and 20 days)
- Kerjan: 21 - 25 August 2019
- Predecessor: Musa Abdul Wahab
- Successor: Azrin Khairi
- Born: Maarof bin Mat Rashad; 21 August 1957 (age 69); Jelebu, Negeri Sembilan, Federation of Malaya (now Malaysia)
- Spouse: Mahawa binti Mohd Som
- House: Kemin
- Father: Mat Rashad
- Religion: Sunni Islam
- Occupation: Teacher

Maarof bin Mat Rashad is one of the four territorial chiefs (Undang Yang Empat) in Negeri Sembilan, Malaysia. He was appointed as the 17th Undang of Jelebu in 2018.

== Early life and education ==
Maarof bin Mat Rashad was born on 21 August 1957 in Jelebu, Negeri Sembilan. He is fifth out of six siblings. He got his education at Maktab Perguruan Raja Melewar, Seremban. Then, he furthered his studies at Open University Malaysia (OUM).

== Teaching career ==
He is a former teacher and a former education officer at Pejabat Pendidikan Daerah Jelebu (Jelebu District Education Office).

== Honours ==
=== Honours of Negeri Sembilan ===
- Negeri Sembilan
  - Recipient of Darjah Tertinggi Negeri Sembilan (DTNS) - Dato' (2019)
  - Recipient of Distinguished Conduct Medal (PPT)
  - Recipient of Order of Loyalty to Negeri Sembilan (ANS)
  - Recipient of Distinguished Service Medal (PCM)
  - Recipient of Devotional Service Medal (PJK)
  - Recipient of Old Service Medal (PKL)

== Title and styles ==
Styles of Maarof Mat Rashad
- Reference style: His Grace
- Spoken style: Your Grace

- 2018–2023: His Grace Dato' Mendika Menteri Akhirulzaman Dato' Maarof bin Mat Rashad, 16th Undang of Jelebu
