= Hossam =

Hossam or Hussam or Hosam or Husam or Hessam (/ˈhɔːˈsɑːm/; Arabic: حسام) is an Arabic/Semitic male given name and surname. It means the sharp sword or a cutting blade. In some traditions it translates to "sword of justice" or "sword that divides justice and injustice". Notable people with the name include: It is more commonly used in the Middle East.

== Given name ==
- Hossam Abdelmoneim (born 1975), Egyptian football player
- Hossam AlJabri, activist, preacher and speaker on Islam and Muslims
- Hossam Mohammed Amin (1950–2021), Iraqi general under Saddam Hussein's government
- Hossam Arafat (Egyptian football player) (born 1990), Egyptian footballer
- Hossam Arafat (Palestinian politician), Palestinian politician
- Hossam Ashour, (born 1986), Egyptian footballer
- Hossam El-Badry (born 1960), Egyptian football manager and former footballer
- Hossam Bahgat (born 1978), Egyptian human rights activist and investigative journalist
- Hossam Eisa, Egyptian politician and academic
- Hussam Fawzi (born 1974), Iraqi footballer
- Hossam Ghaly (born 1981), Egyptian football midfielder
- Hossam Habib (born 1980), Egyptian singer
- Hossam el-Hamalawy (born 1977), Egyptian journalist, blogger, photographer and socialist activist
- Hossam Hassan (born 1966), Egyptian association football player
- Hossam Hassan (born 1989), Egyptian footballer
- Hossam Hassan (born 1993), Egyptian footballer
- Hossam Katerji (born 1982) Syrian businessman and member of Syrian parliament
- Husam ad-Din Manikpuri, Indian Muslim theologian
- Hossam Ramzy (1953–2019), Egyptian professional percussionist, composer and music arranger
- Hussam Al-Rassam (born 1978), Iraqi singer
- Hossam Al-Sabah (1948–2021), Lebanese actor
- Hossam Shabat (2001–2025), Palestinian journalist
- Hussam bin Saud Al Saud (born 1960), Saudi royal
- Husam Waksa (born 1982), Malaysian Royalty, young corporate figure

== Surname ==
- Youssef Hossam (born 1998), Egyptian tennis player banned from tennis for life
