= Abdul Rahman of Negeri Sembilan =

King of Malaya from 1957 to 1960

Abdul Rahman عبدالرحمن
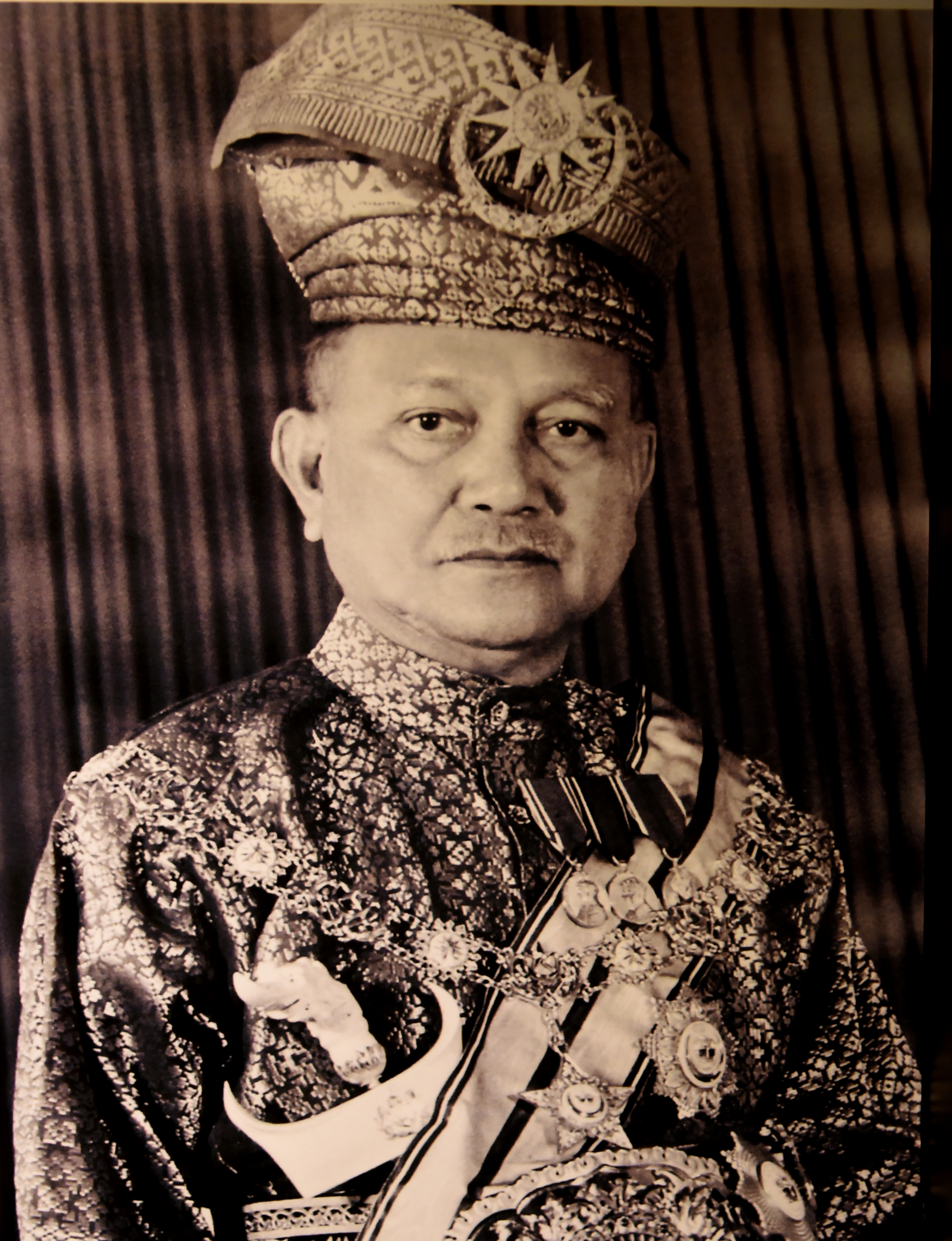
- Abdul Rahman, c. 1950s

King of the Federation of Malaya
- Reign: 31 August 1957 – 1 April 1960
- Installation: 2 September 1957
- Predecessor: Position established Elizabeth II (as Queen)
- Successor: Hisamuddin

Yang di-Pertuan Besar of Negeri Sembilan
- Reign: 3 August 1933 – 1 April 1960
- Installation: 25 April 1934
- Predecessor: Muhammad
- Successor: Munawir
- Born: 24 August 1895; Istana Lama Seri Menanti, Seri Menanti, Negeri Sembilan, Federated Malay States
- Died: 1 April 1960 (aged 64); Istana Negara, Kuala Lumpur, Federation of Malaya
- Burial: 5 April 1960; Seri Menanti Royal Mausoleum, Seri Menanti, Negeri Sembilan, Federation of Malaya
- Spouse: Cik Engku Maimunah binti Abdullah (Dulcie Campbell); Tunku Maharun binti Tengku Mambang Tunku Kurshiah binti Tunku Besar Burhanuddin (m. 1929–1960) Tunku Zaidah binti Tunku Zakaria
- Issue: Tunku Aida; Tunku Munawir; Tunku Ja'afar; Tunku Sheilah; Tunku Abdullah; Tunku Bahiyah; Tunku Shahariah; Tunku Noraida Zakiah
Names
- Tunku Abdul Rahman ibni Tuanku Muhammad
Regnal name
- Tuanku Abdul Rahman ibni Almarhum Tuanku Muhammad
- House: Pagaruyung (House of Yamtuan Raden)
- Father: Tuanku Muhammad ibni Almarhum Tuanku Antah
- Mother: Tunku Halija binti Tunku Muda Chik
- Religion: Sunni Islam

Tuanku Abdul Rahman ibni Almarhum Tuanku Muhammad GCMG (Jawi: توانكو سر عبدالرحمن ابن المرحوم توانكو محمد; 24 August 1895 – 1 April 1960) was the Yang di-Pertuan Besar of Negeri Sembilan from 1933, and the first Yang di-Pertuan Agong of the Federation of Malaya from 1957, until his death in 1960.

== Early career ==
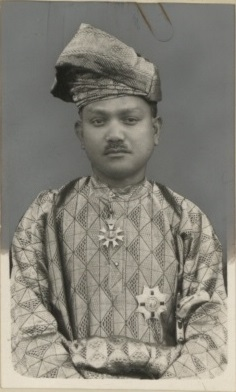
Abdul Rahman in 1937.

Born at Seri Menanti on 24 August 1895, he was the second son of Tuanku Muhammad ibni Tuanku Antah, first Yang di-Pertuan Besar of modern Negeri Sembilan and seventh Yang di-Pertuan Besar of Seri Menanti (1888–1933) by his second wife, Tunku Puan Chik.

He received his primary education at the Jempol Malay School, going on to the Malay College between 1907 and 1914. He worked at the Federal Secretariat in Kuala Lumpur for a period of one year before being appointed Assistant Collector of Land Revenue in Seremban. He served in the Malayan Volunteer Infantry as a second lieutenant, and was promoted lieutenant in 1918.

On the death of his elder brother, Tunku Abdul Aziz, in 1917, he was groomed as heir to the throne and received the title of Tunku Muda Serting.

He was later appointed as Assistant Malay Officer in Klang before being transferred to Sepang. He was then assigned to work in Ulu Selangor as Assistant Collector of Land Revenue. As a result of his perseverance and diligence, he was promoted to Assistant District Officer. The turning point of his career was in 1925, when he served for a short period in the Kuala Lumpur Supreme Court.

In 1925, he accompanied his father, who was then the ruler of Negeri Sembilan, on a trip to the United Kingdom for the British Empire Exhibition in Wembley and to visit King George V. During the journey to the United Kingdom, he decided he wanted to study law. With the approval of his father Tuanku Muhammad, he stayed in the United Kingdom until he completed his studies and received a degree in law.

He stayed on to qualify as a barrister from Inner Temple. Three years later, in 1928, he was admitted to the bar. In London, he was elected first President of the Kesatuan Melayu United Kingdom, one of the earliest Malay nationalist groups.

Upon returning to Malaya in December 1928, he served in the Malayan Civil Service in various parts of the country. For the first few years, he worked hard until he became a Magistrate. Subsequently, he was appointed District Officer.

== Election as Yang di-Pertuan Besar of Negeri Sembilan ==
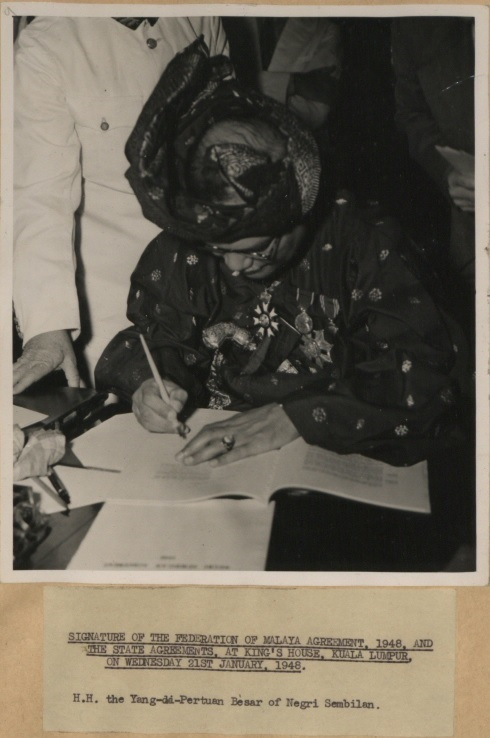
Signature of the Federation of Malaya Agreement, 1948, and the State Agreements, at King's House, Kuala Lumpur, 21 January 1948.

In 1933, following the death of his father, he succeeded him onto the throne of Negeri Sembilan. At that time, he was already an advocate, hence making him the only Malay ruler with an advocate and solicitor's qualifications.

Abdul Rahman (as he became) admitted to British interrogators that he had made speeches in favour of the Japanese during the latter's military occupation of Malaya (1942–1945) but this had been done under duress and that the Japanese forcibly removed certain of his royal privileges.

Although he subsequently signed the Malayan Union treaty, he repudiated it later and upon the suggestion of Sultan Badlishah of Kedah, engaged a London-based lawyer to represent the case of the Malay rulers against the Malayan Union plan of Clement Attlee's government.

== Election as Yang di-Pertuan Agong ==
Abdul Rahman was elected first Yang di-Pertuan Agong or Paramount Ruler of independent Malaya on 31 August 1957 for a five-year term by eight votes to one, defeating the more senior Sultan Abu Bakar of Pahang.

He had been the ruler of Negeri Sembilan for 24 years before being elected as the first Yang di-Pertuan Agong.

== Installation ==
Abdul Rahman was installed as the first Yang di-Pertuan Agong of independent Malaya on 2 September 1957 at the throne room of the Istana Negara.

As Malay rulers do not traditionally possess crowns, he was installed by kissing the royal kris of state (keris kerajaan) to the beat of the nobat, a tradition which has been followed by every Yang di-Pertuan Agong since.

In honour of Abdul Rahman, all subsequent Yang di-Pertuan Agong of Malaysia have also used the headdress with Dendam Tak Sudah (literally Unending Revenge) style, the fashion employed in Negeri Sembilan.

== Death and funeral ==
Abdul Rahman died in his sleep at the Istana Negara in Kuala Lumpur in the early morning of 1 April 1960. The lying in state was held at the Banquet Hall of the Istana Negara. On 2 April 1960, a state funeral procession was held in Kuala Lumpur, whereupon Abdul Rahman's teak coffin was then taken by train to Seremban and later by hearse to the Istana Besar, Seri Menanti. He was buried at the Royal Mausoleum in Seri Menanti, Negeri Sembilan on 5 April 1960.

== Legacy ==
Abdul Rahman's portrait has been featured on the obverse of Malaysian Ringgit banknotes since the first series was issued in 1967.

Sekolah Tuanku Abdul Rahman (English: Tuanku Abdul Rahman School; abbr. STAR) is a premier, all-boys fully residential school in Malaysia funded by the Government of Malaysia and is named after Abdul Rahman. It is located in Ipoh, Perak and was built in 1957.

== Belief in democracy ==
Abdul Rahman believed strongly in parliamentary democracy and one of his most memorable quotes was to a foreign dignitary from the Middle East who in 1959 complained about Prime Minister Tunku Abdul Rahman Putra Al-Haj's "high handed" manner and wanted the King to sack him. To which he replied: "Alas I can't sack him; he is elected by the people, and as Prime Minister of the country he can sack me!"

== Family life ==
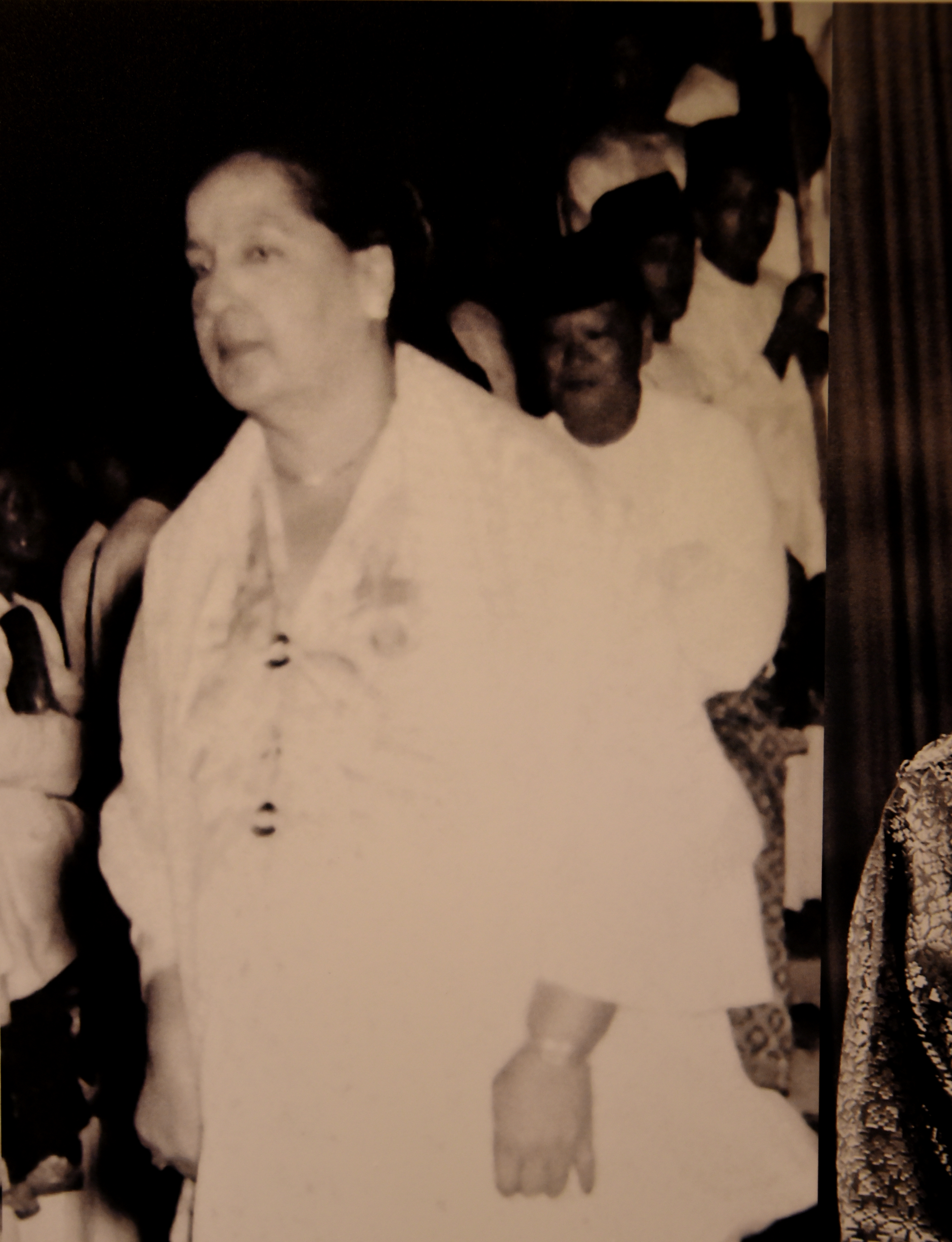
Che Engku Maimunah bt Abdullah, former wife of Tuanku Abdul Rahman and mother of Tuanku Ja'afar. The Tuanku Ja'afar Royal Gallery, Seremban.

Abdul Rahman married four times. His marriages were to:

1. in 1919 to Dulcie Campbell, a Eurasian nurse who embraced Islam and took the name Cik Maimunah (divorced)
2. in 1920 to Tunku Maharun binti Tunku Mambang, a member of the Negeri Sembilan royal family (divorced)
3. in 1929 to Tunku Kurshiah binti Tunku Besar Burhanuddin, a cousin, who became first Raja Permaisuri Agong or Queen of Malaya
4. in 1948 to Tunku Zaidah binti Tunku Zakaria, another cousin.

Abdul Rahman fathered three sons and five daughters. His second wife, Tuanku Maharum gave birth to his firstborn son, Tuanku Munawir. Cik Engku Maimunah, his first wife, gave birth to two sons and two daughters. The eldest is Tunku Aida, followed by Tuanku Ja'afar, Tunku Sheilah and Tunku Abdullah. Tunku Kursiah, his third wife, gave birth to two daughters. His fourth wife, Tunku Zaidah, gave birth to his youngest child, a daughter.

Two of his sons succeeded him as Yang di-Pertuan Besar of Negeri Sembilan:

1. Tuanku Munawir (son of Tunku Maharun), who reigned from 1960 to 1967 as the ninth Yang di-Pertuan Besar.
2. Tuanku Ja'afar (son of Dulcie Campbell), who succeeded his brother in 1967 as the tenth Yang di-Pertuan Besar and reigned until 27 December 2008. He served as the tenth Yang di-Pertuan Agong from 1994 to 1999.

His grandson, Tuanku Muhriz Tuanku Munawir, currently reigns as the eleventh Yang di-Pertuan Besar of Negeri Sembilan since 2008. His other grandson, Tunku Nadzaruddin Tuanku Ja'afar, is currently disputing Muhriz as a pretender to the Yang di-Pertuan Besar throne since 2026.

His daughter, Sultanah Bahiyah, from his third marriage to Tunku Kurshiah, served as Sultanah of Kedah upon the accession of her husband, Sultan Abdul Halim, in 1958 until her death in 2003. She also served as the fifth Raja Permaisuri Agong of Malaysia from 1970 to 1975.

== Issue ==
Name	Birth Date	Death Date	Marriage Date	Spouse	Issue	Grandchildren
Che Engku Maimunah binti Abdullah (m. 1919, divorced)
Tunku Aida	27 May 1920	29 May 1937		Tunku Ma’amor bin Tunku Usoh	Tunku Datuk Sri Mizan	
Tunku Aida	27 May 1920	29 May 1937		Tunku Ma’amor bin Tunku Usoh	Tunku Ainunnisa	
Tunku Aida	27 May 1920	29 May 1937		Tunku Ma’amor bin Tunku Usoh	Tunku Ainah	
Tunku Aida	27 May 1920	29 May 1937		Tunku Ma’amor bin Tunku Usoh	Tunku Maztom	3 daughters
Tunku Aida	27 May 1920	29 May 1937		Tunku Ma’amor bin Tunku Usoh	Tunku Puan Sri Arishah	2 sons and 3 daughters
Tuanku Ja’afar	19 July 1922	27 December 2008	8 August 1942	Tunku Najihah binti Almarhum Tunku Besar Burhanuddin	Tunku Tan Sri Naquiah	Tunku Nadzimuddin; Tunku Datin Mir'atun Madihah; Tunku Nasaifuddin; Tunku Nasruan Adil
Tuanku Ja’afar	19 July 1922	27 December 2008	8 August 1942	Tunku Najihah binti Almarhum Tunku Besar Burhanuddin	Tunku Dato' Seri Utama Naquiyuddin	Tunku Mohamed Alauddin; Tunku Alia Nadira; Tunku Nadia Sahiya; Tunku Khairul Zaim
Tuanku Ja’afar	19 July 1922	27 December 2008	8 August 1942	Tunku Najihah binti Almarhum Tunku Besar Burhanuddin	Tunku Tan Sri Dato' Seri Imran	Tunku Abdul Rahman Aminullah 4 step-children
Tuanku Ja’afar	19 July 1922	27 December 2008	8 August 1942	Tunku Najihah binti Almarhum Tunku Besar Burhanuddin	Tunku Puteri Puan Sri Dato' Seri Jawahir	Tengku Azra Jahan Juzaila; Tengku Aslahuddin Ja’afar; Tengku A'zran Abdul Jawaad
Tuanku Ja’afar	19 July 1922	27 December 2008	8 August 1942	Tunku Najihah binti Almarhum Tunku Besar Burhanuddin	Tunku Dato' Seri Irinah	Tengku Alam Shah Amiruddin; Tengku Aiman Shahirah
Tuanku Ja’afar	19 July 1922	27 December 2008	8 August 1942	Tunku Najihah binti Almarhum Tunku Besar Burhanuddin	Tunku Dato' Seri Nadzaruddin	Tunku Muhammad Hazim Shah Raden; Tunku Muhammad Mish’al Raden; Tunku Ines Najiha Raden
Tunku Sheilah	2 May 1924	25 May 2023	23 August 1942	Tunku Daud bin Tunku Besar Burhanuddin	Tunku Ivy Mu’hsinah	Putri Sian Shaharia binti Sharif Winter
Tunku Sheilah	2 May 1924	25 May 2023	23 August 1942	Tunku Daud bin Tunku Besar Burhanuddin	Tengku Datuk Munasir	Tunku Mutalib; Tunku Muzaffar; Tunku Maisura Adibah
Tunku Sheilah	2 May 1924	25 May 2023	23 August 1942	Tunku Daud bin Tunku Besar Burhanuddin	Tunku Mu’tasim	Tunku Mahzuz; Tunku Mahir; Tunku Masna
Tunku Sheilah	2 May 1924	25 May 2023	23 August 1942	Tunku Daud bin Tunku Besar Burhanuddin	Tunku Mukhrizah	
Tunku Sheilah	2 May 1924	25 May 2023	23 August 1942	Tunku Daud bin Tunku Besar Burhanuddin	Tunku Roxana	Paul Kamil Lafrance; Sarah Melane Lafrance
Tunku Tan Sri Abdullah	2 May 1925	19 August 2008	22 April 1946 (div. 1958)	Tunku Zahara binti Tunku Zakaria	Tunku Dato’ Sri Iskandar	Tunku Idalyn Mazura; Tunku Izrina Mazuin; Tunku Izora Mulaika
Tunku Tan Sri Abdullah	2 May 1925	19 August 2008	22 April 1946 (div. 1958)	Tunku Zahara binti Tunku Zakaria	Tunku Hajjah Marina Ashraf	Mazran Zamani; Mazlina Zairin; Mizfarah Zara; Mazrah Zuraihan
Tunku Tan Sri Abdullah	2 May 1925	19 August 2008	22 April 1946 (div. 1958)	Tunku Zahara binti Tunku Zakaria	Tunku Dato’ Kamil Ikram	Tunku Shazwan Kaiyisha; Tunku Arina Nakita; Tunku Arina Nashita
Tunku Tan Sri Abdullah	2 May 1925	19 August 2008	6 August 1959 (div. 30 March 1966)	Che Ho Yuzin binti Abdullah	Tunku Dato’ Yaacob Khyra	Tunku Elana Khyra; Tunku Leana Khyra; Tunku Amaan Khyra; Tunku Nadya Khyra; Tunku Omaan Khyra; Tunku Imaan Khyra; Tunku Rmaan Khyra
Tunku Tan Sri Abdullah	2 May 1925	19 August 2008	6 August 1959 (div. 30 March 1966)	Che Ho Yuzin binti Abdullah	Tunku Yahaya	Tunku Mikael
Tunku Tan Sri Abdullah	2 May 1925	19 August 2008	6 August 1959 (div. 30 March 1966)	Che Ho Yuzin binti Abdullah	Tunku Halim	Tunku Kristina Radin; Tunku Adam Radin
Tunku Tan Sri Abdullah	2 May 1925	19 August 2008	30 March 1966 (div. 20 February 1970)	Cik Khadija binti Abdullah	Tunku Soraya Dakhlah	
Tunku Tan Sri Abdullah	2 May 1925	19 August 2008	21 April 1973 (div. 1991)	Che Engku Chesterina binti Abdullah		
Tunku Tan Sri Abdullah	2 May 1925	19 August 2008	10 August 1991 (div. 1996)	Cik Engku Maimunah binti Abdullah		
Tunku Tan Sri Abdullah	2 May 1925	19 August 2008	25 April 1997	Puan Sri Che Engku Rozita binti Ahmad Baharuddin	Tunku Muhammad Shah	
Tunku Tan Sri Abdullah	2 May 1925	19 August 2008	25 April 1997	Puan Sri Che Engku Rozita binti Ahmad Baharuddin	Tunku Intan Kursiah	
Tuanku Ampuan Maharunnisa binti Tunku Mambang (m. March 1921, div. 1923)
Tuanku Munawir	29 March 1922	14 April 1967	1 January 1940	Tuanku Ampuan Durah binti Almarhum Tunku Besar Burhanuddin	Tunku Umpa Munawirah	Tengku Mu'adzam Sadruddin; Tengku Munawir Islahuddin; Tengku Mu'amir Izzuddin
Tuanku Munawir	29 March 1922	14 April 1967	1 January 1940	Tuanku Ampuan Durah binti Almarhum Tunku Besar Burhanuddin	Tunku Mudziah	Syed Mashafud-din bin Syed Badaruddin Jamalullail; Sharifa Basma Alawiya binti Syed Badaruddin Jamalullail; Sharifa Bahiya Abla binti Syed Badaruddin Jamalullail; Sharifa Bashira Asma binti Syed Badaruddin Jamalullail
Tuanku Munawir	29 March 1922	14 April 1967	1 January 1940	Tuanku Ampuan Durah binti Almarhum Tunku Besar Burhanuddin	Tuanku Muhriz	Tunku Ali Redhauddin; Tunku Zain Al-'Abidin; Tunku Alif Hussein Saifuddin Al-Amin
Tuanku Munawir	29 March 1922	14 April 1967	1 January 1940	Tuanku Ampuan Durah binti Almarhum Tunku Besar Burhanuddin	Tunku Datin Anne Dakhlah	Siti Mazeera; Siti Mazlina; Siti Mazlynda
Tuanku Munawir	29 March 1922	14 April 1967	1 January 1940	Tuanku Ampuan Durah binti Almarhum Tunku Besar Burhanuddin	Tunku Deborah	2 daughters
Tuanku Munawir	29 March 1922	14 April 1967	1 January 1940	Tuanku Ampuan Durah binti Almarhum Tunku Besar Burhanuddin	Tunku Datin Deanna	Tengku Amera Nafisah; Tengku Nadia Azrina; Tengku Dahira Azirah
Tuanku Kurshiah binti Almarhum Tunku Besar Burhanuddin (m. 21 March 1929)
Sultanah Bahiyah	24 August 1930	26 August 2003	9 March 1956	Al-Sultan Al-Mu’tassimu Billahi Muhibbuddin Tuanku Al-Haj Abdul Halim Mu'adzam Shah ibni Almarhum Sultan Badlishah	Tunku Soraya binti Almarhum Tengku Abdul Aziz (adopted)	Raja Nabil Imran; Raja Idris Shah; Raja Sarina Intan Bahiyah; Raja Safia Azizah; Raja Sifuddin Muadzam Shah
Sultanah Bahiyah	24 August 1930	26 August 2003	9 March 1956	Al-Sultan Al-Mu’tassimu Billahi Muhibbuddin Tuanku Al-Haj Abdul Halim Mu'adzam Shah ibni Almarhum Sultan Badlishah	Tunku Sarina binti Almarhum Tengku Abdul Aziz (adopted)	
Sultanah Bahiyah	24 August 1930	26 August 2003	9 March 1956	Al-Sultan Al-Mu’tassimu Billahi Muhibbuddin Tuanku Al-Haj Abdul Halim Mu'adzam Shah ibni Almarhum Sultan Badlishah	Tan Sri Tunku Puteri Intan Shafinaz	
Tunku Hajah Shahariah	8 April 1932		25 October 1956	Tunku Abdul Rahman ibni Almarhum Sultan Ismail Al-Khalidi	Tunku Abu Bakar	Tunku Kurshiah Aminah Atiah; Tunku Abdul Rahman Burhanuddin; Tunku Aishah Johara
Tunku Zaidah binti Tunku Zakaria (m. 1948)
Tunku Noraida Zakiah	6 December 1950	—N/a		Encik Abdul Rahim bin Abdul Manaf	Putri Norashiqin	

== Hobbies and interests ==
Abdul Rahman had an interest in sports such as cricket, football and tennis. His favourite sport was boxing. When he was young, he would wear boxing gloves to box with his sons.

== Awards and recognitions ==
=== National Honours ===
- Malaya
  - Grand Master (1958–1960) and Recipient of the Order of the Crown of the Realm (DMN, 1958)
  - Grand Master (1958–1960) and Grand Commander of the Order of the Defender of the Realm (SMN) – Tun (1958)

=== Foreign Honours ===
- United Kingdom
  - Knight Grand Cross of the Order of St Michael and St George (GCMG) (1957)
  - Knight Commander of the Order of St Michael and St George (KCMG) (1934)
  - Recipient of the King George V Silver Jubilee Medal (1935)
  - Recipient of the King George VI Coronation Medal (1937)
  - Recipient of the Queen Elizabeth II Coronation Medal (1953)
- Brunei
  - Member First Class of the Family Order of Laila Utama (DK) – Dato Laila Utama (1959)

=== Places named after him ===
- Jalan Tuanku Abdul Rahman, a road in Kuala Lumpur
  - Medan Tuanku district in downtown Kuala Lumpur
  - Medan Tuanku Monorail station
- Sekolah Tuanku Abdul Rahman, an all-boys school in Ipoh, Perak
- Tuanku Abdul Rahman Mosque in Sarikei, Sarawak
- Tuanku Abdul Rahman Stadium in Paroi, Negeri Sembilan
- SK Tuanku Abdul Rahman, a primary school in Gemas, Negeri Sembilan
- SMK Tuanku Abdul Rahman, a secondary school in Gemas, Negeri Sembilan
- SMK Tuanku Abdul Rahman, a secondary school in Nibong Tebal, Penang
- SMK Tuanku Abdul Rahman, a secondary school in Rawang, Selangor
- Tuanku Abdul Rahman Residential College, a residential college at University of Malaya, Kuala Lumpur

== Notes ==
Regnal titles
Preceded by office created	Yang di-Pertuan Agong (Supreme King of Malaysia); 31 August 1957 – 1 April 1960	Succeeded by Hisamuddin Alam Shah (Sultan of Selangor)
Preceded by Tuanku Muhammad	Yang di-Pertuan Besar of Negeri Sembilan; 3 August 1933 – 1 April 1960	Succeeded by Tuanku Munawir
