= Institute for Pioneering of Education and Economic Excellence =

Malaysian think tank

- Abbreviation: INSPIRE
- Formation: 12 June 2012
- Founder: Engku Isa Al-Husam and Mohd Fitri Ibrahim
- Founded at: Penang, Malaysia
- Type: Non-profit organisation, NGO
- Legal status: Institute
- Purpose: Education and economic
- Headquarters: Bandar Tun Razak, Kuala Lumpur
- Location: Malaysia
- Region served: Malaysia
- Website: inspire.org.my

Institute for Pioneering of Education and Economic Excellence (INSPIRE) is a Malaysian first national think tank dedicated on promoting entrepreneurship and business based education excellence. It is the first Malaysia Non profit organisation, Non-politics that is focusing on promoting and development of entrepreneurship among youth.

It was founded on 12 June 2012 by Engku Isa Al-Husam and Mohd Fitri Ibrahim in Penang and later joined by Tunku 'Abidin Muhriz and Dato' Kusyairie Amir as the board of advisors. INSPIRE headquartered at Bandar Tun Razak, Kuala Lumpur.
