= Berkatlah Yang DiPertuan Besar Negeri Sembilan =

State anthem of Negeri Sembilan, Malaysia

English: Bless the Great Lord of Negeri Sembilan
- Coat of arms of Negeri Sembilan
- State anthem of Negeri Sembilan
- Lyrics: Tunku Zakaria Mambang
- Music: Andrew Caldecott (composition) Tunku Zain Al-'Abidin Muhriz (arrangement)
- Adopted: 1911

Audio sample
- Berkatlah Yang DiPertuan Besar Negeri Sembilan (instrumental): file; help

"Berkatlah Yang di-Pertuan Besar" (chorus)
Official anthem of Negeri Sembilan (vocal)

"Berkatlah Yang DiPertuan Besar Negeri Sembilan" (pronounced [bərkatlah jaŋ dipərtuan bəsar nəgəri səmbilan]) is the state anthem of Negeri Sembilan. It was composed by Andrew Caldecott (1884–1951) with lyrics by Tunku Zakaria Mambang. It was adopted as an official state anthem in 1911 at the behest of Tuanku Muhammad Shah (1865–1933), the seventh Yang di-Pertuan Besar, who ruled Negeri Sembilan from 1888 to 1933.

The anthem was subject to the fine-tuning efforts of the second son of the current Yang DiPertuan Besar, Tunku Zain Al-'Abidin ibni Tuanku Muhriz. The rearranged composition, recorded with the Malaysian Philharmonic Orchestra and choir groups from several schools across the state, was first presented to the public on the installation ceremonies of Tuanku Muhriz and his wife Tuanku Aishah Rohani in early 2009, and it was officially launched on 27 October 2010.

The line "Musuhnya habis binasa" from the anthem serves as motto for the state's football team, Negeri Sembilan FC.

== Lyrics ==
Rumi script

Berkatlah Yang Di-Pertuan Besar Negeri Sembilan,
Kurniai sihat dan makmur,
Kasihi rakyat, lanjutkan umur!
Akan berkati sekalian yang setia,
Musuhnya habis binasa!
Berkatlah Yang Di-Pertuan Besar Negeri Sembilan.

Jawi script
برکتله يڠ دڤرتوان بسر نݢري سمبيلن⹁
کورنياءي صيحت دان معمور⹁
كاسيهي رعيت⹁ لنجوتکن عمور!
اکن برکتي سکالين يڠ ستيا⹁
موسوهڽ هابيس بيناس!
برکتله يڠ دڤرتوان بسر نݢري سمبيلن.
IPA transcription (Note: Help:IPA/Malay.)

[bərkatlah jaŋ dipərtuan bəsar nəgəri səmbilan]
[kurni‿ai sihat dan maʔmur]
[kasihi raʔjat landʒutkan umur]
[akan bərkati səkali‿an jaŋ səti‿a]
[musuhɲa habis binasa]
[bərkatlah jaŋ dipərtuan bəsar nəgəri səmbilan]

English translation

Blest be, thou whom art made Lord o'er Negeri Sembilan,
May thou be ever well,
And guide and care for us, thy people!
Those loyal to him shall be blessed,
All his foes shall fell!
Blest be, thou whom art made Lord o'er Negeri Sembilan.
