= Engku Isa Al-Husam =

Engku Isa Al Husam
- Born: 12 August 1982 (age 44); Kedah

Yang Mulia Engku Isa Al-Husam (born 12 August 1982), is the Founder and the President of the Institute for Pioneering of Education and Economic Excellence (INSPIRE) He is the grandson to the 7th Yang di-Pertua Negeri of Penang Tun Abdul Rahman Abbas. Husam is from the Royal Household of Kedah Pattani Royal Family.

== Early life and education ==
Husam received his early school education, mainly in Arabic and science stream, from Maahad Al Mashoor Al Islami and SMKA Al Irshad both in Penang. He obtained a bachelor's degree in Technology (Information System) minoring in Corporate Management from Universiti Teknologi Petronas.

== Career ==
Husam was formerly a committee member of the Penang Malay Businessmen and Industrialist Association Malaysia and the Treasurer of Penang Malay Chamber of Commerce Malaysia Youth Wing. At international level he sits in committee and chair several task force groups in the Indonesia Malaysia Thailand Growth Triangle (IMT-GT) and LIMA DASAR under the portfolio of Ministry of International Trade and Industry. He is also the member of Malaysia Business Council – Saudi Arabia.

Husam was the youngest committee member of Penang Government Executive Council for the portfolio of International Trade and Industry chaired by YB Dato' Mansor Bin Haji Osman, Deputy Chief Minister (1) of Penang (2010–2013) and was the Associate Director of Institute for Democracy and Economic Affairs (IDEAS). Husam currently sits as the Board of Trustees for Malaysia Cancer Foundation. He is also the Vice-President and CEO of his own group of companies besides his various roles as independent body in organisations, charity and governmental agencies.

Husam founded the first Malaysia based online groceries known as foodmarket in supporting SME food industry mainly from villagers and cottage industry. He was presented the Prime Minister Award in 2015 under the category Social Entrepreneur by Malaysia Digital Economy Corporation (MDEC).

== Charity work ==
He was the founder of Young Entrepreneur Club (YEC) in Universiti Teknologi Petronas and the founding President of the Maahad Al Mashoor Al Islami, Alumni Association. He is also a member of a charity organisation in Perak named Kelab Bakti Gunung Keledang. Husam was the founder and the President of the Institute for Pioneering of Education and Economic Excellence (INSPIRE), first national Think Tank, Non Political and Non-Profit Organisation that focuses on promoting entrepreneurship and business-based education excellence. INSPIRE was co-founded with Fitri Ibrahim, Dato'Kusyairie Amir Ahmad Zahidi and Tunku 'Abidin Muhriz. Husam authored the book #SEBELUMIAHILANG (before it's gone) to create the awareness of the dying of Kelantan's architectural heritage and launched the social page to support the work Husam also mooted the idea and the brain child of the development of Penang Mosque Apps on year 2013 which is a Mobile app to search for heritage mosque around Penang within the UNESCO heritage area which later funded by Think City a subsidiary of Khazanah Nasional and the Penang Islamic Foundation. He also initiated and curated the Street art 3D mural in conjunction of the 2014 Merdeka Celebration, #InspirasiMalaysia (Malaysia Inspiration) depicting the first Malaysia Prime Minister Tunku Abdul Rahman Putra Al Haj and it has become viral and created an attraction to the public. In his various roles he has been interviewed for numerous television programmes, magazines and newspaper features.

== Awards ==
Awards

- 2015: Social Entrepreneur Award from MDEC presented
- 2018: Exporter Award from MATRADE presented by Minister of International Trade and Industry Dato' Sri Mustapa Mohamed

== Honours ==
He has been conferred

Medal of the Crown of Kelantan
Seri Mahkota Kelantan SMK

Distinguished Conduct Medal
Pingat Kelakuan Terpuji PKT

Meritorious Service Medal
Pingat Jasa Kebaktian PJK
