= Tunku Alif Hussein =

Malaysian Noble

Tunku Alif Hussein Saifuddin Al-Amin تونكو اليف حسين سيف الدين الأمين
- Born: 3 September 1984; Kuala Lumpur Hospital, Kuala Lumpur, Malaysia
- Died: 15 January 2016 (aged 31); Hospital Canselor Tuanku Muhriz, Kuala Lumpur
- Burial: Seri Menanti Royal Mausoleum, Kuala Pilah, Negeri Sembilan
Names
- Tunku Alif Hussein Saifuddin Al-Amin ibni Tuanku Muhriz
- Dynasty: Pagaruyung
- Father: Tuanku Muhriz ibni Almarhum Tuanku Munawir
- Mother: Tuanku Aishah Rohani binti Almarhum Tengku Besar Mahmud
- Religion: Sunni Islam

Tunku Alif Hussein Saifuddin Al-Amin ibni Tuanku Muhriz (Jawi: تونكو اليف حسين سيف الدين الأمين ابن توانكو محرز; 3 September 1984 – 15 January 2016), was the third son of the reigning Yang di-Pertuan Besar of Negeri Sembilan, Tuanku Muhriz ibni Almarhum Tuanku Munawir and the Tunku Ampuan Besar of Negeri Sembilan, Tuanku Aishah Rohani binti Almarhum Tengku Besar Mahmud.

== Family ==
Tunku Alif Hussein was born on 3 September 1984 at Kuala Lumpur Hospital, as the third son and youngest child of Tuanku Muhriz ibni Almarhum Tuanku Munawir (the reigning Yang di-Pertuan Besar of Negeri Sembilan) and Tuanku Aishah Rohani.

His siblings were:

- Tunku Ali Redhauddin, Tunku Besar of Seri Menanti (born 26 April 1977).
- Tunku Zain Al-'Abidin, Tunku Panglima Besar (born 6 July 1982).

== Education ==
He was educated at The Institutes for the Achievement of Human Potential (IAHP), Philadelphia, Pennsylvania, United States.

== Death ==
Tunku Alif died on 15 January 2016 at Hospital Canselor Tuanku Muhriz in Kuala Lumpur following an illness. He was 31 years old. He was buried at the Seri Menanti Royal Mausoleum, Kuala Pilah.

== Ancestry ==
Ancestors of Tunku Alif Hussein

8. Tunku Abdul Rahman bin Tunku Muhammad
4. Tunku Munawir bin Tunku Abdul Rahman
9. Tunku Maharunnisa binti Tunku Membang
2. Tunku Muhriz bin Tunku Munawir
10. Tunku Burhanuddin bin Tunku Antah
5. Tunku Durah binti Tunku Burhanuddin
11. Tunku Sharifa Alawiya binti Sayyid Abdul Hamid
1. Tunku Alif Hussein Saifuddin Al-Amin
12. Sultan Zainal Abidin III of Terengganu
6. Tengku Mahmud bin Sultan Zainal Abidin
13. Tengku Hajjah Aisha Mandak binti Tengku Mustafa
3. Tengku Aisha Rohani Tengku Mahmud
14. Haji Su Mahmud bin Dato' Sri Amar di Raja Haji Ngah Muhammad
7. To' Puan Hajjah Zainun Mariam binti Haji Su Mahmud
15. Wok Khadija
