= Zulkifeli Mohd Zin =

Malaysian general (born 1956)

Yang Berbahagia General (Rtd) Tan Sri Dato' Seri Zulkifeli Mohd Zin PGAT PMN PSM PJN SPMK SPMS SPMP SPKK SSDK SSAP SIMP DPPN SPDK SUMW SPMT SPTS SSTM PNBS DHMS DCSM PSAT DGMK DPKK DMSM DSDK PMW PAT JMN SDK KMN AMK ASK PPS PPA PJM PKN DPKT DUBC PM NI(M)
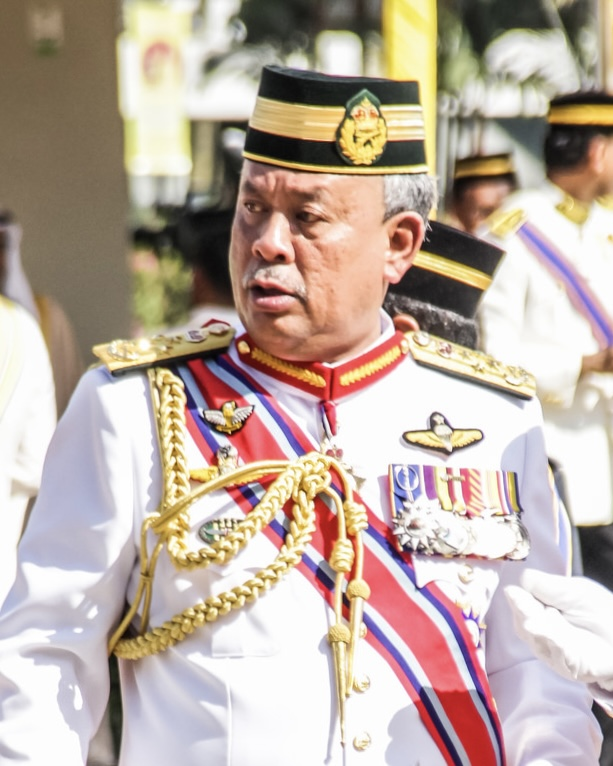
- General Zulkifeli in 2013

1st Director General of National Security Council
- In office 15 August 2016 – 31 August 2018
- Monarchs: Abdul Halim; Muhammad V
- Prime Minister: Najib Razak; Mahathir Mohamad
- Succeeded by: Engku Hamzah Tuan Mat

18th Chief of Defence Forces
- In office 15 June 2011 – 16 December 2016
- Monarchs: Mizan Zainal Abidin; Abdul Halim; Muhammad V
- Prime Minister: Najib Razak
- Minister of Defence: Ahmad Zahid Hamidi; Hishammuddin Hussein
- Preceded by: Azizan Ariffin RMAF
- Succeeded by: Raja Mohamed Affandi Raja Mohamed Noor

23rd Chief of Army
- In office 21 May 2010 – 14 June 2011
- Preceded by: Muhammad Ismail Jamaluddin
- Succeeded by: Zulkifli Zainal Abidin

Personal details
- Born: 14 June 1956 (age 70) Pasir Mas, Kelantan, Federation of Malaya (now Malaysia)
- Spouse: Umi Kalsom Wan Awang
- Education: Sultan Ismail College; Sandhurst Military Academy
- Occupation: Senior military officer, senior civil servant

Military service
- Allegiance: Malaysia; Yang di-Pertuan Agong
- Branch/service: Malaysian Army
- Years of service: 1974–2016
- Rank: General
- Commands: Army Field Headquarters; 3rd Infantry Division; Commander of IMT Mission - Mindanao; 8th Infantry Brigade; Commandant of Army Combat Training Centre
- Awards: Courageous Commander of the Order of Military Service (PGAT)
- Mission: IMT Mission - Mindanao 2013 Lahad Datu Standoff

Zulkifeli bin Mohd. Zin (born 14 June 1956) is a retired military officer and a former Chief of Defence Forces of Malaysia.

== Education ==
He was educated at Sultan Ismail College (SIC) in Kelantan. On 9 August 1974, upon completion of his cadet training in Sandhurst, he was first commissioned as a second lieutenant to the 2nd Royal Malay Regiment as a platoon commander.

He holds a Master of Science degree from the National Defense University.

He is also a graduate from the Malaysian Armed Forces Staff College (MTAT) and the Malaysian Armed Forces Defence College (MPAT). Both colleges have since been consolidated as one under the National Defense Studies Centre (Puspahanas).

== Military career (1974–2016) ==
Throughout his military career, he has held various positions ranging from platoon commander to commanding officer.

He also held staff positions in the Army Headquarters and Training Institute. This included stints as Staff Officer of the Army Headquarters as well as the Trick Trainer at the Army Training Centre of Johor Bahru. In 1999 and 2000, he was the Infantry Director of the Army Headquarters.

While serving as a colonel, he was the commandant of Army Combat Training Centre (PULADA) and Resource Colonel in the Army Headquarters.

He was promoted to the rank of brigadier general in 2002 and held the office of assistant commander of Reserve Services Division. He also commanded 8th Infantry Brigade (8 Bgd) from 2003 to 2004 in Kelantan. He was then promoted to the rank of major general and was entrusted by the military high command to lead the International Monitoring Team Mission – Mindanao as the commander of the Monitoring Team between 9 October 2004 and 31 August 2005.

Then, he was the 3rd Infantry Division (3 Div) Commander from 17 October 2005 to 31 January 2007. He was the commander of Army Field Headquarters from 2 January 2007 to 1 June 2008.

As a dedicated leader, he was appointed deputy army commander on 2 June 2008 – serving until 20 May 2010 upon which he was appointed Chief of Army (Malay: Panglima Tentera Darat — PTD).

Due to high confidence in him, he was appointed the 18th Chief of Defence Forces effective on 15 June 2011.

He retired on 16 December 2016.

== Director General of National Security Council (2016–2018) ==
He was appointed the 1st Director General of National Security Council (NSC; Malay: Majlis Keselamatan Negara — MKN) on 15 August 2016, when he still holding the post of Chief of Defence Forces. He has been the first-ever with military background appointed to the seat. Before this, the title for NSC chief is 'Secretary General' and given only to Senior Civil Servant in Malaysian Government. He was replaced by Engku Hamzah Tuan Mat as director general of NSC beginning 1 September 2018.

== Personal life ==
He is married to Puan Sri Datin Seri Umi Kalsom Wan Awang and together had two daughters.

== Honours ==
=== Honours of Malaysia ===
- Malaysia
  - Commander of the Order of the Defender of the Realm (PMN) – Tan Sri (2012)
  - Commander of the Order of Loyalty to the Crown of Malaysia (PSM) – Tan Sri (2011)
  - Commander of the Order of Meritorious Service (PJN) – Datuk (2008)
  - Companion of the Order of the Defender of the Realm (JMN) (2005)
  - Officer of the Order of the Defender of the Realm (KMN) (2002)
  - Recipient of the Loyal Service Medal (PPS)
  - Recipient of the General Service Medal (PPA)
  - Recipient of the National Sovereignty Medal (PKN) (2014)
  - Recipient of the 9th Yang di-Pertuan Agong Installation Medal
  - Recipient of the 10th Yang di-Pertuan Agong Installation Medal
  - Recipient of the 11th Yang di-Pertuan Agong Installation Medal
  - Recipient of the 12th Yang di-Pertuan Agong Installation Medal
  - Recipient of the 13th Yang di-Pertuan Agong Installation Medal
  - Recipient of the 14th Yang di-Pertuan Agong Installation Medal
  - Recipient of the 16th Yang di-Pertuan Agong Installation Medal
- Malaysian Armed Forces
  - Courageous Commander of the Most Gallant Order of Military Service (PGAT)
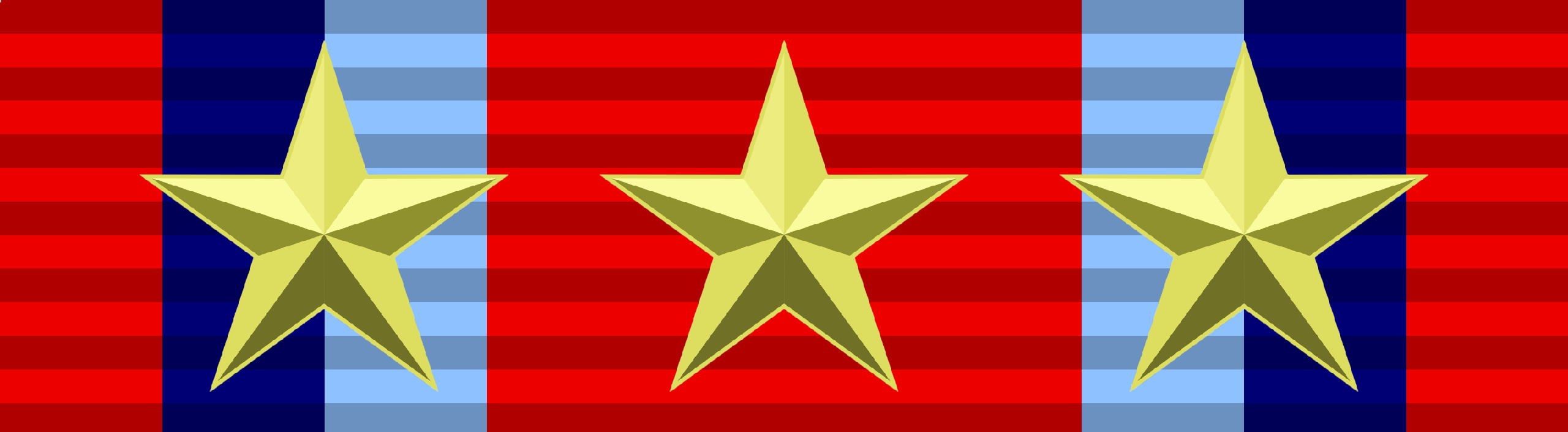
  - Loyal Commander of the Most Gallant Order of Military Service (PSAT)
  - Warrior of the Most Gallant Order of Military Service (PAT)
  - Recipient of the Malaysian Service Medal (PJM)
- Federal Territory (Malaysia)
  - Grand Knight of the Order of the Territorial Crown (SUMW) – Datuk Seri Utama (2016)
  - Commander of the Order of the Territorial Crown (PMW) – Datuk (2009)
- Kedah
  - Knight Grand Companion of the Order of Loyalty to the Royal House of Kedah (SSDK) – Dato' Seri (2012)
  - Knight Commander of the Order of Loyalty to Sultan Abdul Halim Mu'adzam Shah (DHMS) – Dato' Paduka (2011)
  - Knight Commander of the Order of the Crown of Kedah (DGMK) – Dato' Wira (2008)
  - Knight Companion of the Order of Loyalty to the Royal House of Kedah (DSDK) – Dato' (2004)
  - Companion of the Order of Loyalty to the Royal House of Kedah (SDK) (2000)
  - Member of the Order of the Crown of Kedah (AMK) (1996)
  - Recipient of Sultan Abdul Halim Golden Jubilee Medal (2008)
- Kelantan
  - Knight Grand Commander of the Order of the Crown of Kelantan (SPMK) – Dato' (2011)
  - Knight Grand Commander of the Order of the Noble Crown of Kelantan (SPKK) – Dato' (2007)
  - Knight Commander of the Order of the Noble Crown of Kelantan (DPKK) – Dato' (2004)
  - Member of the Order of the Loyalty to the Crown of Kelantan (ASK)
  - Recipient of the Sultan Ismail Petra Silver Jubilee Medal (2004)
- Malacca
  - Knight Commander of the Order of Malacca (DCSM) – Datuk Wira (2012)
  - Companion Class I of the Order of Malacca (DMSM) – Datuk (2006)
- Negeri Sembilan
  - Grand Knight of the Order of Loyalty to Tuanku Muhriz (SSTM) – Dato' Seri (2011)
- Pahang
  - Knight Grand Companion of the Order of Sultan Ahmad Shah of Pahang (SSAP) – Dato' Sri (2010)
  - Grand Knight of the Order of the Crown of Pahang (SIMP) – Dato' Indera (2008)
- Penang
  - Knight Commander of the Order of the Defender of State (DPPN) – Dato' Seri (2011)
- Perak
  - Knight Grand Commander of the Order of Taming Sari (SPTS) – Dato' Seri Panglima (2011)
- Perlis
  - Knight Grand Commander of the Order of the Crown of Perlis (SPMP) – Dato' Seri (2011)
- Sabah
  - Grand Commander of the Order of Kinabalu (SPDK) – Datuk Seri Panglima (2013)
- Sarawak
  - Knight Commander of the Order of the Star of Sarawak (PNBS) – Dato Sri (2015)
- Selangor
  - Knight Grand Commander of the Order of the Crown of Selangor (SPMS) – Dato' Seri (2012)
  - Recipient of the Sultan Salahuddin Silver Jubilee Medal (1985)
- Terengganu
  - Knight Grand Commander of the Order of the Crown of Terengganu (SPMT) – Dato' (2012)

=== International honours ===
- Brunei
  - First Class of the Order of Paduka Keberanian Laila Terbilang (DPKT) (2012)
- Indonesia
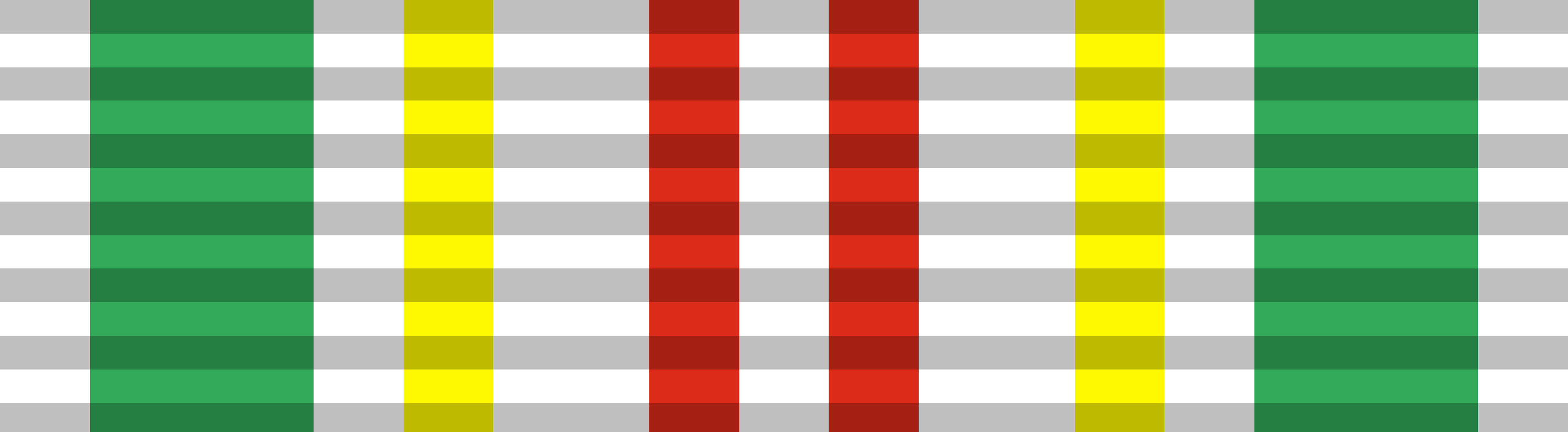
  - First Class (Utama) of the Star of Yudha Dharma (2012)
  - First Class (Utama) of the Star of Kartika Eka Paksi (2012)
- Pakistan
  - Recipient of the Nishan-e-Imtiaz (NI) (2015)
- Philippines
  - Commander of the Philippine Legion of Honour (CLH) (2005)
- Singapore
  - Recipient of the Darjah Utama Bakti Cemerlang (Tentera) (DUBC) (2014)
- Thailand
  - Knight Grand Cross of the Order of the Crown of Thailand (2014)
- United Arab Emirates
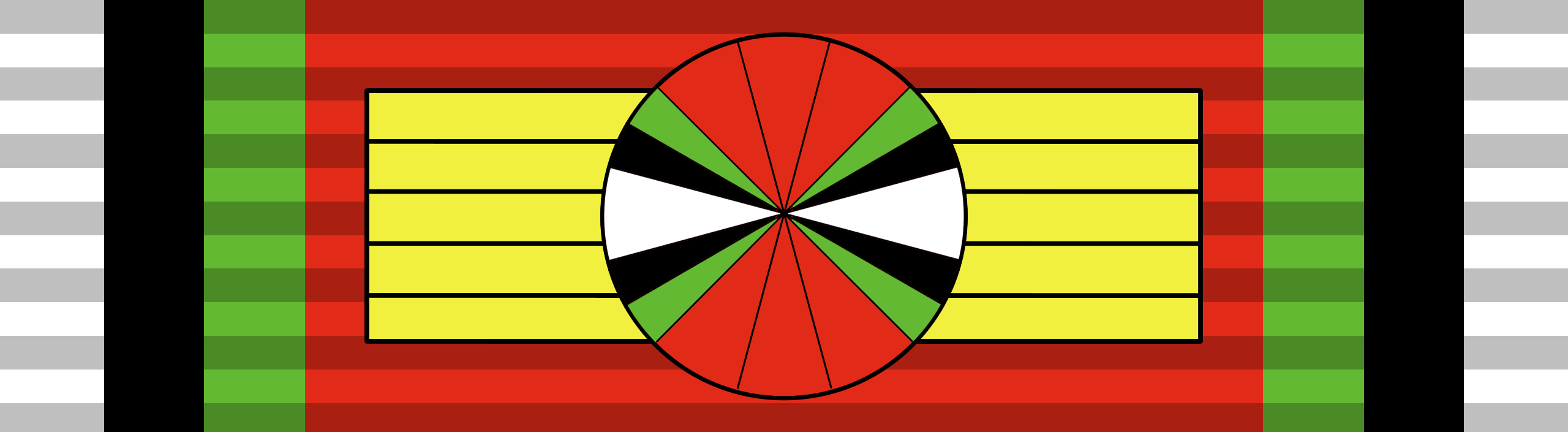
  - First Class of the Emirates Military Order (2015)
