= Order of Loyalty to Tuanku Muhriz =

The Order of Loyalty to Tuanku Muhriz Darjah Setia Tuanku Muhriz

Awarded by Yang di-Pertuan Besar of Negeri Sembilan
- Type: Order
- Founded: 14 January 2010
- Awarded for: recognising and rewarding loyal and meritorious service to the reigning Yang di-Pertuan Besar
- Status: Currently constituted
- Founder: Tuanku Muhriz
- Grand Master: Tuanku Muhriz
- Grades: Knight Grand Companion (SSTM); Knight Companion (DSTM); Officer (DTM); Member (STM); Herald (BTN)
- Post-nominals: S.S.T.M.; D.S.T.M.; D.T.M.; S.T.M.; B.T.M.

Statistics
- First induction: 14 January 2010
- Last induction: 14 January 2025

Precedence
- Next (higher): Order of Loyalty to Negeri Sembilan
- Next (lower): Order of Loyal Service to Negeri Sembilan
- Grand Companion Other classes Ribbon bars

The Order of Loyalty to Tuanku Muhriz (Malay: Darjah Setia Tuanku Muhriz) is an order of chivalry of the state of Negeri Sembilan which was constituted by Tuanku Muhriz, the Yang di-Pertuan Besar of Negeri Sembilan on 14 January 2010 in conjunction with his 62nd birthday to replace the Grand Order of Tuanku Jaafar which became obsolete following the death of his predecessor, Tuanku Ja'afar.

The order is conferred to recognise and reward loyal and meritorious service to the reigning Yang di-Pertuan Besar, Tuanku Muhriz.

== Background ==
The Order of Loyalty to Tuanku Muhriz was established on 14 January 2010 by the Yang di-Pertuan Besar of Negeri Sembilan Tuanku Muhriz on his 62nd birthday. The order replaced the Grand Order of Tuanku Jaafar which became obsolete following the death of Tuanku Ja'afar in 2008.

== Classes ==
The Order of Loyalty to Tuanku Muhriz is conferred in five classes:

- Knight Grand Companion (SSTM)
- Knight Companion (DSTM)
- Officer (DTM)
- Member (STM)
- Herald (BTM)

The Knight Grand Companion bear the honorific title of Dato’ Seri and their wives are titled as Datin Seri. The husbands of the female recipients of the Grand Commander class do not bear any title.

The Knight Companion bear the honorific title of Dato’ and their wives are titled as Datin. The husbands of the female recipients of the Commander class do not bear any title.

== Insignia ==
The insignia of the Order of Loyalty to Tuanku Muhriz for Knights Grand Companion include the collar, the sash, and star of the order. The sash is green with a central wide yellow strip and two thin black and red stripes at both ends of the yellow strip.

The Knights Companion wear the sash and star of the order. The sash for the Knights Companion is similar to the Knight Grand Companion's sash, except for the yellow bar being narrow.

Ribbon bars
Knight Grand Companion	Knight Companion	Companion	Officer	Herald

== Recipients ==
- Ref:

=== Knight Grand Companion (S.S.T.M.) ===
- 2010: Azman Hashim
- 2010: Md Raus Sharif
- 2010: Muhammad Ismail Jamaluddin
- 2010: Raja Arshad Raja Uda
- 2010: Tengku Hasmuddin Tengku Othman
- 2010: Tunku Mizan Tunku Maamor
- 2011: Zulkifeli Mohd Zin
- 2012: Tunku Alang
- 2013: Ali Hamsa
- 2013: Khalid Abu Bakar
- 2013: Sharifah Hapsah
- 2013: Zaini Ujang
- 2013: Zulkifli Zainal Abidin
- 2014: Tunku Ali Redhauddin
- 2014: Abd Wahab Maskan
- 2015: Tengku Syed Badarudin Jamalullail
- 2017: K. Sree Raman
- 2018: Tunku Zain Al-'Abidin

=== Knight Companion (D.S.T.M.) ===
- 2010: Joseph Menezes
- 2010: Leong Yoke Fei
- 2010: Mohamad Nazari Mohd Nor
- 2010: Mohd Ridzwan Mohd Ariff
- 2010: Syed Tahir Syed Ja'afar
- 2010: Tengku Amran
- 2010: Tengku Munasir
- 2010: Tunku Hanizar
- 2010: Zulkifly Sheikh Ahmad
- 2011: Ahmad Fuad Abdul Rahman
- 2011: Anthony Geoffrey Cooper
- 2011: Tunku Mahmood Fawzy
- 2012: Koay Soon Eng
- 2012: Leong Hong Tole
- 2012: Mahendra Raj a/l P. Sundramoorthy
- 2012: Meheshinder Singh
- 2012: Muhammad Fuad
- 2012: Yeow Wah Chin
- 2013: Khong Kim Lyew
- 2013: Tengku Baharuddin
- 2013: Tunku Zainudin
- 2014: Jenny Tong May Geok
- 2014: Nasharuddin Hussin
- 2014: Satber Kaur Manjit Singh
- 2014: Woo Swee Lian
- 2015: Tunku Arishah
- 2015: Mansor Yusof
- 2015: Tunku Maziah
- 2015: Mohamad Nasir Nordin
- 2015: Nik Ismail Nik Yahya
- 2015: Syed Mohamad Nasir
- 2016: Hajeedar Abdul Majid
- 2016: Vivienne Leong Foong Lai
- 2017: Raja Salbiah Tengku Nujumudin
- 2017: Wan Rahiza Wan Mat
- 2018: Faizah Jamaludin
- 2020: Hartini Zainudin
- 2020: Tunku Mohamed Alauddin
- 2020: Zukri Samat
- 2021: Hamdan Leman
- 2021: Kathleen Chew Wai Lin
- 2021: Tengku Mu'adzam Sadruddin
- 2021: Tamil Selvan a/l K Muthusamy
- 2022: Azizi Mohamad Ali
- 2022: Mohammad Ariff Sidek
- 2023: Hanizam Harun
- 2023: Ting Choon Ee
- 2023: Tunku Nooruddin
- 2025: Sheranjiv a/l Sammanthan

== See also ==
- Orders, decorations, and medals of Negeri Sembilan
- Orders, decorations, and medals of the Malaysian states and federal territories#Negeri Sembilan
- List of post-nominal letters (Negeri Sembilan)
