= Muhammad Ismail Jamaluddin =

22nd Chief of the Malaysian Army (2007–2010)

Yang Berbahagia General (Rtd) Tan Sri Muhammad Ismail Jamaluddin PGAT PSM PJN SSAP SIMP DGPN SPTS SSTM PSAT DGMK DSMZ DSDK PAT JMN SMJ KMN AMN BCK PPS PPA PNBB PJM PM
- محمد اسماعيل جمال الدين

22nd Chief of Army
- In office 1 February 2007 – 20 May 2010
- Monarch: Mizan Zainal Abidin
- Prime Minister: Abdullah Ahmad Badawi (2007 - 2009); Najib Razak (2009 - 2010)
- Minister of Defence: Najib Razak (2007 - 2008); Abdullah Ahmad Badawi (2008 - 2009); Ahmad Zahid Hamidi (2009 - 2010)
- Preceded by: Abdul Aziz Zainal
- Succeeded by: Zulkifeli Mohd Zin

Personal details
- Born: 21 September 1952 (age 74) Johor Bahru, Johor, Federation of Malaya
- Spouse: Rosmalisa Abdullah
- Children: 3
- Education: Royal Military College, Kuala Lumpur; Asian Institute of Management

Military service
- Allegiance: Malaysia
- Branch/service: Malaysian Army
- Years of service: 1971–2010
- Rank: General
- Unit: Royal Malay Regiment
- Battles/wars: Second Malayan Emergency

Muhammad Ismail bin Hj Jamaluddin (Jawi: محمد اسماعيل بن حاج جمال الدين; born 21 September 1952) is a Malaysian retired military officer who served as the 22nd Chief of Malaysian Army from February 2007 to May 2010.

== Early life and education ==
Ismail was born on 21 September 1952 in Johor Bahru. In 1970, he attended the Officer Cadet Course at Royal Military College, Sungai Besi, completing the course in 1971. He also graduated with a Master in Management from Asian Institute of Management in 1996.

== Military career ==
Ismail was commissioned as a junior lieutenant on 16 April 1971 and posted as an officer in 8th Battalion, Royal Malay Regiment. Throughout his military career, he has served in various positions, including as Commander of Malaysian Contingent IV (MALCON IV-SFOR) in 1997, Commander of 10th Parachute Brigade from 1999 to 2000, Commander of 3rd Infantry Division from 2003 to 2004, Assistant Chief of Staff (Defence Planning), Armed Forces HQ from 2004 to 2005, and Deputy Chief of Army from 2005 until 2007.

Ismail was appointed the 22nd Chief of Army on 1 February 2007 following appointment of his predecessor Abdul Aziz Zainal as the 16th Chief of Defence Forces. He held the position until his retirement on 20 May 2010 and was succeeded by Zulkifeli Mohd Zin.

== Personal life ==
Ismail was married to Rosmalisa binti Abdullah and blessed with two daughters and one son. He likes reading and playing golf in his spare time.

== Honours ==
=== Honours of Malaysia ===
- Malaysia
  - Commander of the Order of Loyalty to the Crown of Malaysia (PSM) – Tan Sri (2007)
  - Commander of the Order of Meritorious Service (PJN) – Datuk (2006)
  - Companion of the Order of the Defender of the Realm (JMN) (2004)
  - Officer of the Order of the Defender of the Realm (KMN) (1997)
  - Member of the Order of the Defender of the Realm (AMN) (1983)
  - Recipient of the Loyal Service Medal (PPS)
  - Recipient of the General Service Medal (PPA)
  - Recipient of the United Nations Missions Service Medal (PNBB) with "BOSNIA" clasp (1997)
  - Recipient of the 10th Yang di-Pertuan Agong Installation Medal
  - Recipient of the 12th Yang di-Pertuan Agong Installation Medal
  - Recipient of the 13th Yang di-Pertuan Agong Installation Medal
- Malaysian Armed Forces
  - Courageous Commander of the Most Gallant Order of Military Service (PGAT)
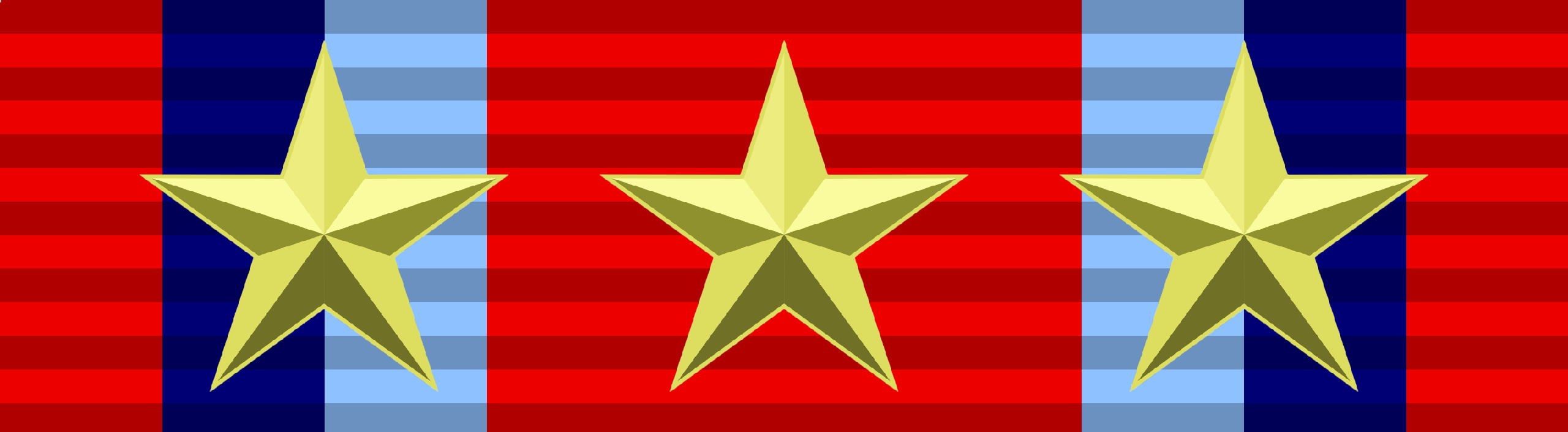
  - Loyal Commander of the Most Gallant Order of Military Service (PSAT)
  - Warrior of the Most Gallant Order of Military Service (PAT)
  - Recipient of the Malaysian Service Medal (PJM)
- Johor
  - Companion of the Order of the Crown of Johor (SMJ) (1999)
- Kedah
  - Knight Commander of the Glorious Order of the Crown of Kedah (DGMK) – Dato' Wira (2006)
  - Knight Companion of the Order of Loyalty to the Royal House of Kedah (DSDK) – Dato' (2000)
  - Recipient of the State of Kedah Distinguished Service Star (BCK) (1990)
- Negeri Sembilan
  - Knight Grand Companion of the Order of Loyalty to Tuanku Muhriz (SSTM) – Dato' Seri (2010)
- Pahang
  - Knight Grand Companion of the Order of Sultan Ahmad Shah of Pahang (SSAP) – Dato' Sri (2008)
  - Knight Grand Companion of the Order of the Crown of Pahang (SIMP) – formerly Dato', now Dato' Indera (2005)
- Penang
  - Commander of the Order of the Defender of State (DGPN) – Dato' Seri (2007)
- Perak
  - Knight Grand Commander of the Order of Taming Sari (SPTS) – Dato' Seri Panglima (2008)
- Terengganu
  - Knight Companion of the Order of Sultan Mizan Zainal Abidin of Terengganu (DSMZ) – Dato' (2006)

=== Foreign honours ===
- Indonesia
  - First class (Utama) of the Star of Kartika Eka Paksi (2010)
- NATO
  - Recipient of the SFOR Medal (1997)
- Thailand
  - Knight Grand Cross of the Order of the Crown of Thailand (PM) (2010)
