= Tuanku Aishah Rohani =

Queen consort of Negeri Sembilan since 2008

Aishah Rohani عائشة روحاني
- Aishah Rohani in 2023

Tunku Ampuan Besar of Negeri Sembilan
- Tenure: 29 December 2008 – present
- Installation: 14 April 2009
- Predecessor: Tuanku Najihah
- Contender: Tunku Mimi Wahida (since 19 April 2026)

Chancellor of Universiti Sains Islam Malaysia
- Tenure: 3 December 2011 - present
- Predecessor: Tuanku Najihah
- Born: 19 June 1952 (age 74); Batu Gajah, Perak, Federated Malay States (now Malaysia)
- Spouse: Tuanku Muhriz (m. 1974)
- Issue: Tunku Ali Redhauddin; Tunku Zain Al-'Abidin; Tunku Alif Hussein Saifuddin Al-Amin (died on 15 January 2016)
Names
- Tengku Aishah Rohani binti Tengku Mahmud
Regnal name
- Tuanku Aishah Rohani binti Almarhum Tengku Besar Mahmud
- Dynasty: Bendahara (by birth); Pagaruyung (by marriage)
- Father: Tengku Besar Mahmud ibni Almarhum Sultan Zainal Abidin III of Terengganu
- Mother: To' Puan Hajah Zainun Meriam binti Haji Su Mahmud
- Religion: Sunni Islam

Tuanku Aishah Rohani binti Almarhum Tengku Besar Mahmud (Jawi: توانكو عائشة روحاني بنت المرحوم تڠكو بسر محمود née Tengku Aishah Rohani binti Tengku Mahmud; born 19 June 1952) is the current Tunku Ampuan Besar (Queen consort) of Negeri Sembilan. She is married to the current Yang di-Pertuan Besar of Negeri Sembilan, Tuanku Muhriz.

== Background ==
Princess Aishah was born on 19 June 1952 in Batu Gajah, Perak to Prince Mahmud of Terengganu (a son of Zainal Abidin III of Terengganu) and his second wife, To' Puan Hajah Zainun Meriam binti Haji Su Mahmud..

Aishah studied in Sekolah Rendah Sultan Sulaiman, Kuala Terengganu and later Convent Taiping. She also studied in Convent Bukit Nanas in Kuala Lumpur.

She previously worked in a bank where she met her husband, Tunku Muhriz.

== Royal engagement ==
On 16 February 1973, the royal engagement between Tunku Besar of Seri Menanti Tunku Muhriz, then aged 25 years and Terengganu princess Tengku Aishah Rohani, then aged 21 years and 7 months old (she was only four months short of her 22nd birthday) took place at Istana Terengganu, Jalan Pekeliling.

Prior to their engagement and courtship, Tunku Muhriz was employed as an administrative officer at Bank Rakyat whilst his future wife Tengku Aishah Rohani was working as a clerk at local bank in Malaysia.

== Royal marriage ==
On 25 April 1974 (corresponding to the Islamic calendar date of 2 Rabiul Akhir 1394 Hijri), she tied the knot to a Negeri Sembilan prince, Tunku Besar of Seri Menanti Tunku Muhriz when she was 22 years and 10 months old (two months short of her 23rd birthday). Their royal wedding reception was held at Istana Maziah, Kuala Terengganu witnessed by Tunku Muhriz's mother, Tunku Ampuan Durah along with other members of the Negeri Sembilan and Terengganu royal families.

On 4 May 1974, Tunku Ampuan Durah held a royal couples departure ceremony (istiadat keberangkatan balik pengantin diraja) at Istana Lama Seri Menanti. Their royal highnesses conjoined on the wedding dais also in Istana Lama Seri Menanti.

Tuanku Muhriz (wearing the white mask), Tuanku Aishah Rohani (his left side), Muhammed Abdullah (his right side) and Tunku Syed Razman watching the funeral of Tunku Ampuan Najihah on 8 September 2023. Behind Tuanku Muhriz, there were Tunku Nadzaruddin, talking with a group of people and Tunku Zain Al-'Abidin (yawning).

== Royal family ==
Tengku Aishah married Tunku Muhriz in Istana Maziah, Kuala Terengganu on 25 April 1974 and the couple are blessed with three sons namely Tunku Ali Redhauddin, the Tunku Besar Seri Menanti of Negeri Sembilan, Tunku Zain 'Abidin, the Tunku Panglima Besar and the late Tunku Alif Hussein Saifuddin Al-Amin.

- The eldest son, Tunku Besar of Seri Menanti Tunku Ali Redhauddin was born on 26 April 1977 at University of Malaya Hospital.
- The second son, Tunku Panglima Besar Tunku Zain Al-'Abidin was born on 6 July 1982 at University of Malaya Hospital.
- The youngest son, Tunku Alif Hussein Saifuddin Al-Amin was born on 3 September 1984 with lack of Vitamin K on his brain and died on 15 January 2016 at Hospital Canselor Tuanku Muhriz following an illness. He was laid to rest at Seri Menanti Royal Mausoleum, Kuala Pilah.

== Becoming queen (2008–present) ==
Tuanku Aishah was installed the 11th Tunku Ampuan Besar of Negeri Sembilan on 14 April 2009 in Seri Menanti royal palace. The ceremony was steeped in tradition and followed old Negeri Sembilan royal customs where the installation of the queen preceded the installation of the Yang di-Pertuan Besar of Negeri Sembilan.

== Styles and honours ==
Styles of Tuanku Aishah Rohani
- Reference style: Her Royal Highness
- Spoken style: Your Royal Highness
- Alternative style: Tuanku

- Since 14 April 2009: Her Royal Highness Tuanku Aishah Rohani binti Almarhum Tengku Besar Mahmud, Tunku Ampuan Besar of Negeri Sembilan

The styles of Tuanku Aishah Rohani is:

Her Royal Highness Tuanku Aishah Rohani binti Almarhum Tengku Besar Mahmud, Tunku Ampuan Besar of Negeri Sembilan

=== Honours ===
Negeri Sembilan

- Member of the Royal Family Order of Negeri Sembilan (DKNS) (21 April 2009)
- Knight Commander of the Grand Order of Tuanku Ja’afar (DPTJ) – Dato' (19 July 1996)
- Recipient of the Distinguished Conduct Medal (DPT)
- Recipient of the Tuanku Muhriz Installation Medal (26 October 2009)

== Places named after her ==
Several places were named after her, including:

- Hospital Tunku Ampuan Besar Tuanku Aishah Rohani (Hospital Pakar Kanak-Kanak, Universiti Kebangsaan Malaysia; HPKK UKM), a paediatric specialist hospital located in Jalan Yaacob Latif, Cheras, Kuala Lumpur. The hospital is located next to Hospital Canselor Tuanku Muhriz UKM, which is named after her husband, in his capacity as Chancellor of UKM.
- Sekolah Menengah Sains Tuanku Aishah Rohani, an all-girls science school in Seremban, Negeri Sembilan
