= Institute for Democracy and Economic Affairs =

Malaysian think tank

- Abbreviation: IDEAS
- Formation: 8 February 2010
- Founders: Tunku 'Abidin Muhriz, Wan Saiful Wan Jan and Wan Mohd Firdaus Wan Mohd Fuaad
- Founded at: London, United Kingdom
- Type: Non-profit organisation Public policy think tank
- Legal status: Institute
- Headquarters: Kuala Lumpur
- Location: Malaysia
- Region served: Malaysia
- Founding President: Tunku Zain Al-'Abidin ibni Tuanku Muhriz
- Chief Executive Officer (CEO): Aira Azhari
- Website: www.ideas.org.my

The Institute for Democracy and Economic Affairs (IDEAS) is a Malaysian think tank dedicated to promoting solutions to public policy challenges. It was founded on 8 February 2010. IDEAS is headquartered at Menara Atlan, Kuala Lumpur.

== History ==
The idea to establish an institute to debate public policy ideals was first mooted by Tunku 'Abidin Muhriz, Wan Saiful Wan Jan and Wan Mohd Firdaus Wan Mohd Fuaad in early 2006, who thought there was a need to promote liberal ideas to Malaysians in a more strategic and organised fashion. The think tank's founding is inspired by the vision of Tunku Abdul Rahman Putra al-Haj, the first Prime Minister of Malaysia, who stated in the 1957 Proclamation of Independence that Malaysia should:

...be for ever a sovereign democratic and independent State founded upon the principles of liberty and justice and ever seeking the welfare and happiness of its people and the maintenance of a just peace among all nations...

In October 2006, the organisation was registered as a non-profit company limited by guarantee in England and Wales. The ‘working name’ of the organisation was Malaysia Think Tank London (MTTL), reflecting the founders' operations in London at that time. However, when organising activities in Malaysia, they dropped the word 'London' and used just Malaysia Think Tank (MTT).

In May 2009, the Executive Board decided that all operations would be fully moved from London to Malaysia, after given that sufficient groundwork had been laid. Wan Saiful Wan Jan was appointed as the Chief Executive in 1 October of the same year. After a comprehensive situational review on 14 December, the Executive Board decided to relaunch the organisation as the Institute for Democracy and Economic Affairs (IDEAS), a new name that clearly reflects the areas of their work. IDEAS is currently partnered with the Atlas Economic Research Foundation in Washington, D.C. and receives grants from the International Policy Network and the Friedrich Naumann Foundation.

In 2010, a joint University of Pennsylvania–United Nations University index called the 2010 Global Go-To Think Tank Report ranked IDEAS as the 18th best new think tank in the world and the second best new think tank in Asia.

=== Wau Bebas Logo ===
IDEAS’ logo is the wau bulan that flies freely in the sky – hence its name “Wau Bebas” or the Kite of Freedom. The traditional Wau Bebas motif symbolises IDEAS’ belief that the principles of Rule of Law (Kedaulatan Undang-Undang), Limited Government (Kerajaan Terhad), Free Markets (Pasaran Bebas), and Free Individuals (Individu Merdeka), are deeply rooted in Malaysia’s tradition and heritage.

"Their task is to rediscover these truly Malaysian values and to re-present them to contemporary Malaysian society so that their heritage will help Malaysia to prosper in a globalised world. A wau is only complete and functional when it is rooted to the ground via a string, depicting our call for abidance to the rule of law within a small, limited state".

== Research Pillars ==
=== Resilient Democracy ===
IDEAS envisions a Malaysia with a multiparty democratic system, where both government and opposition parties compete on the same playing field. Key institutions remain independent of partisan, political, or personal influence. The group holds that civil liberties – including freedom of speech and expression, freedom of association, and the right to dissent – must be fully protected as foundational elements of a democracy.

=== Competitive Economy ===
IDEAS enhances a competitive economy to support greater prosperity and higher living standards for all. It contributes to the regional and global economies through open trade and investment, which increases productivity and creates more and higher-paying jobs for Malaysian workers. The central contributions of micro, small, and medium enterprises – including women entrepreneurs – are recognised, and inclusive markets are promoted to enable them to thrive.

The growing importance of future industries, such as artificial intelligence, digital and bio-technologies, and clean energy, is acknowledged, along with the need for policies that position Malaysia to secure high-value-added activities. Recognising global uncertainty, IDEAS emphasises the importance of enhancing Malaysia’s and ASEAN’s resilience to future shocks.

=== Accountable Governance ===
In the area of accountable governance, IDEAS envisions a Malaysia where government decision-making is firmly grounded in clear, predictable rules rather than discretionary practices. Public information is made accessible by default, enabling citizens to make informed choices and hold the government to account.

Public institutions operate with high standards of transparency, and leadership appointments are guided by merit, ensuring integrity, competence, and public trust. We believe that Malaysia will benefit from a decentralised governance system, where decisions are made by those closest to the people and implemented by independent institutions.

=== Inclusive Society ===
IDEAS advocates for an inclusive society in Malaysia where equality of opportunity serves as a key policy driver. This includes accessible, high-quality education for all, with particular attention to disadvantaged groups such as the Orang Asli, refugees, and persons with disabilities.

=== Advancing Sustainability ===
In championing a sustainable and climate-resilient Malaysia, IDEAS recognises the rising centrality of climate change to future prosperity and inclusion. Malaysian households and businesses face rising threats from an increasingly hot and hazardous climate, and policies to mitigate the worst impacts. Natural disasters and extreme heat are becoming more frequent and severe, with adaptation needed to reduce the damage.

Major global markets are raising emissions and environmental standards, threatening Malaysian export competitiveness if adjustments are not made. Without purposefully inclusive policies, climate change will worsen inequality and create spillovers that undermine democracy and governance.
