= Hossam Al-Sabah =

Lebanese actor (1948–2021)

- حسام الصباح
- Born: 1948; Nabatieh, Lebanon
- Died: May 29, 2021 (aged 72–73); Sidon, Lebanon
- Occupation: Actor

Hossam Jawad Al-Sabah (Arabic: حسام الصباح; 1948 – 29 May 2021) was a Lebanese actor. He died in a Sidon hospital, after being in a coma for ten days following a car accident.

== Filmography ==
=== Feature Films ===
Year	Title	Role	Notes
1982	The Explosion		
1983	Al Makhtuf		
1983	The Risk Taker		
1986	Ma'araka		
1992	Naji El Ali		
1998	Fatayat Iilqatl		
2004	The Bruise on the Olive		
2011	Khallet Warde	Hossam Al-Sabah	
2012	A Man of Honor	Abou Riad	
2016	Nuts	Boutros	
2016	The Bride's Bracelet		
2018	Morine	Zakoyo	
2021	The Anger	Father	

=== Television ===
Year	Title	Role	Notes
1996	Awraq El Zaman El Murr		Production manager
1999	Izz ad-Din al-Qassam	Abdul Malik	1 episode
2009	Riah El Thawra	Hossam Al-Sabah	
2011	Al Ghaliboun		2 episodes
2011	Al Armala W Al Shaytan		49 episodes
2013	Qiyamat Al Banadiq	Abu Haydar	31 episodes
2014	Wajaa El Rouh		
2014	Daawat Moqawem	Hossam Al-Sabah	
2015	Ain El Jawza		17 episodes
2016	Aarous w Aaris		38 episodes
2017	Ghazala		Voice role
2017	Ghadi in the Land of Stars		Voice role
2018	50 Alef		18 episodes
2019	Kingdoms of Fire	Ibn Kamal	2 episodes
2021	2020		1 episode

=== Short Films ===
Year	Title	Role	Notes
2016	Al Barzakh	Hossam Al-Sabah	
2017	Last Days of the Man of Tomorrow	Vartan Ohanian	
2018	Turritopsis Dhornii	Alaa	
2020	Frayed Roots	Sheikh	

== Awards ==
Year	Award	Nominee/Work	Category	Result	Ref
2016	Jordan International Film Festival	Al Barzakh	Best Actor First Role	Nominated	
