= Tunku Ali Redhauddin =

Tunku Besar of Seri Menanti

Tunku Ali Redhauddin تونكو علي رضا الدين
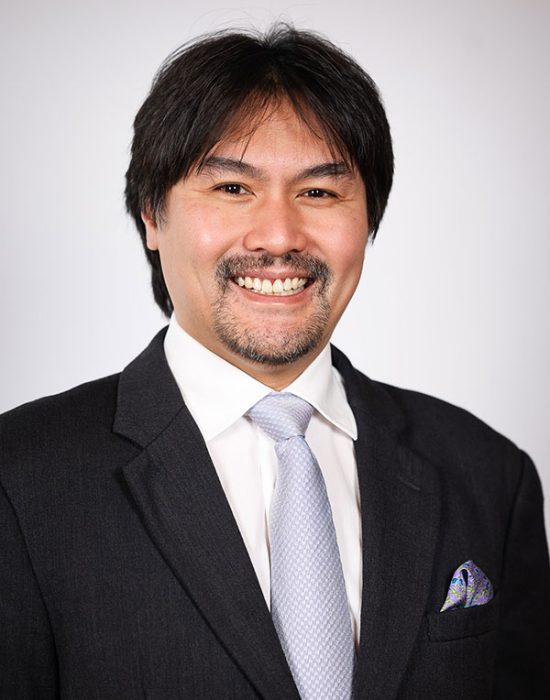

Tunku Besar of Seri Menanti
- Tenure: 22 February 2009 – present
- Proclamation: 22 February 2009
- Predecessor: Tunku Muhriz

Pro-Chancellor National University of Malaysia
- Tenure: 25 November 2023 - present
- Born: 26 April 1977 (age 49); University Hospital, Petaling Jaya, Selangor
Names
- Tunku Ali Redhauddin bin Tunku Muhriz (at birth)
Regnal name
- Tunku Ali Redhauddin ibni Tuanku Muhriz
- Dynasty: Pagaruyung
- Father: Tuanku Muhriz
- Mother: Tuanku Aishah Rohani
- Religion: Sunni Islam
- Military career
- Allegiance: Malaysia; Negeri Sembilan
- Branch: Rejimen Askar Wataniah
- Rank: Brigadier General
- Unit: Rej 508 AW

Tunku Ali Redhauddin ibni Tuanku Muhriz (Jawi: تونكو علي رضا الدين ابن توانكو محرز ; born 26 April 1977) is a member of the Negeri Sembilan royal family who is the Tunku Besar of Seri Menanti. He is the eldest son of the reigning Yang di-Pertuan Besar of Negeri Sembilan Tuanku Muhriz ibni Almarhum Tuanku Munawir and the Tunku Ampuan Besar of Negeri Sembilan, Tuanku Aishah Rohani binti Almarhum Tengku Besar Mahmud.

He was proclaimed the Tunku Besar (Senior Prince) of Seri Menanti on 22 February 2009 and also a member of the Negeri Sembilan Council of Justice and Law.

In 2009, Tunku Ali was also conferred the Order of the Yam Tuan Raden (DKYR), the second highest order of honour in Negeri Sembilan. This award is reserved for relatives of His Royal Highness the Yang di-Pertuan Besar of Negeri Sembilan Darul Khusus and members of the royal families of other Malaysian states.

In 2014, Tunku Ali was conferred the Order of Seri Setia Tuanku Muhriz (SSTM), the recipients of which are styled as Dato' Seri, in recognition of his contributions and service to the state.

He was recognised as a Young Global Leader in 2013 by World Economic Forum and was named an Asia 21 Young Leader by the Asia Society.

Tunku Ali is also an Honorary Bencher of the Inner Temple, United Kingdom.

Besides his official duties, Tunku Ali divides his time between corporate boards, non-profit entities and educational institutions.

== Family ==
Tunku Ali Redhauddin was born on 26 April 1977 at University Hospital, Petaling Jaya, Selangor as the eldest son of Tunku Muhriz (the then Tunku Besar of Seri Menanti) and his consort Tengku Aishah Rohani.

He has two siblings:

- Tunku Zain Al-'Abidin (born 6 July 1982).
- Tunku Alif Hussein (born 3 September 1984 – died 15 January 2016).

== Education ==
Tunku Ali received his early education at Sri Inai Junior School and the Alice Smith School Kuala Lumpur before continuing his education at Marlborough College, Wiltshire, United Kingdom at the GCSE ('O' Level) and GCE 'A' Level. Tunku Ali was actively involved in sports, whereby he represented his college in badminton and basketball. In college, he also participated in the CCF Mixed Cadet Force.

His excellent results in his 'A' Level has enabled Tunku Ali to be awarded the Sime Darby/Cambridge Commonwealth Trust Fellowship and he continued his tertiary education at the University of Cambridge in 1995. He graduated with a B.A (Hons) in History, Social Sciences and Politics in 1998. At Cambridge, Tunku Ali was a committee member of the Malaysian Student Association and was the Treasurer of the Cambridge University Orient Express, an association formed to enhance cross-cultural understanding between students of diverse multicultural background of Asia and the United Kingdom. Tunku Ali also attended courses at the University of Oxford, UK.

He graduated with a Masters in Public Administration at John F Kennedy School of Government, Harvard University, USA in July 2011.

== Career ==
=== Corporate ===
Tunku Ali started his career in 1998 with McKinsey & Company and worked out of its London, Hong Kong and Singapore offices where he advised governments and large corporations on issues ranging from long-term strategy to organisational and corporate governance. From 2004 until 2010, Tunku Ali was with Khazanah Nasional as Director of Investments where he was actively involved in several significant transformation projects and strategic investments in Malaysia and abroad. From then on, he has taken on multiple corporate positions in various industries.

He is presently Senior Advisor to TPG Capital, a global private equity firm. He serves on the boards of several TPG portfolio companies, including Pathology Asia Holding (a Singapore based provider of diagnostic laboratory services), a Southeast Asian hospital group. He is the Chairman of Astro Malaysia Holdings Berhad and Taliworks Corporation Berhad, both listed in Malaysia. He is also a board member of Bangkok Bank Berhad. In 2025, Tunku Ali was appointed as Chairman of Cement Industries of Malaysia Bhd (CIMA), and to the board of Mr D.I.Y Group.

Separately, he is a Partner at Vynn Capital, an early-stage Venture Capital firm with investments in mobility based technologies.

=== Non-Profit ===
Tunku Ali is also active in the non-profit sector where he devotes his time towards charitable endeavours and educational entities. Tunku Ali is the Chairman of the Board of Trustees of Yayasan Munarah, the Negeri Sembilan Royal Family Foundation. He is a Trustee of Amanah Warisan Negara. He is currently President of WWF Malaysia, having served as Chairman from 2014 to 2022; and Chairman of Cancer Research Malaysia.

=== Education ===
He is Chairman and Founding Trustee of Teach For Malaysia, an independent, not-for-profit organisation whose mission is to provide all children in Malaysia the opportunity to attain an excellent education. Tunku Ali is Pro-Chancellor at Universiti Kebangsaan Malaysia, and Chairman of Asia Pacific University of Technology & Innovation (APU), International Medical University (IMU), and XCL Education Group, Malaysia, which operates 7 primary and secondary school campuses in the country. Furthermore, he is the Chairman of the Board of Governors of Marlborough College Malaysia, and an International Council Member of Marlborough College, United Kingdom. He was previously Pro-Chancellor at Universiti Sains Islam Malaysia (USIM).

=== Military ===
Tunku Ali is also a Brigadier General and Commander of a Regiment in the Territorial Army of Malaysia.

== Tunku Besar of Seri Menanti (2009 - present) ==
On 22 February 2009, Tunku Ali was made the title Tunku Besar (Senior Prince) of Seri Menanti when he was 32 following his father, Tuanku Muhriz was proclaimed as the 11th Yang di-Pertuan Besar Negeri Sembilan.

His title as Tunku Besar of Seri Menanti made him as a member of the Negeri Sembilan Council of Justice and Law that participated by Yang di-Pertuan Besar Negeri Sembilan, Undang Yang Empat and Tunku Besar Tampin.

== Styles and honours ==
Styles of Tunku Ali Redhauddin
- Reference style: His Highness
- Spoken style: Your Highness
- Alternative style: Tunku

- 26 April 1977 – 28 December 2008: His Highness Tunku Ali Redhauddin ibni Tunku Muhriz
- 29 December 2008 – 21 February 2009: His Highness Tunku Ali Redhauddin ibni Tuanku Muhriz
- 22 Februari 2009–present: His Highness Tunku Ali Redhauddin ibni Tuanku Muhriz, Tunku Besar of Seri Menanti

The styles of Tunku Ali Redhauddin is:

His Highness Tunku Ali Redhauddin ibni Tuanku Muhriz, Tunku Besar of Seri Menanti

=== Honours ===
- Negeri Sembilan
  - Recipient of the Royal Family Order of Yamtuan Radin Sunnah (DKYR) (20 October 2009)
  - Grand Knight of the Order of Loyalty to Tuanku Muhriz (SSTM) – Dato' Seri (2014)
  - Recipient of the Tuanku Muhriz Installation Medal (26 October 2009)

=== Malaysia ===
- Malaysia
  - Recipient of the 16th Yang di-Pertuan Agong Installation Medal (30 July 2019)
- Kedah
  - Recipient of the Sultan Sallehuddin Installation Medal (22 October 2018)
- Perak
  - Recipient of the Sultan Azlan Shah Silver Jubilee Medal (2009)
  - Recipient of the Sultan Nazrin Shah Installation Medal (6 May 2015)

Malaysian royalty
| Preceded by Muhriz of Negeri Sembilan | Line of succession to the throne of Negeri Sembilan; 1st position | Succeeded by Tunku Zain Al-'Abidin |
