= Hossam AlJabri =

American activist

Hossam AlJabri (Arabic: حسام الجابري) is an activist, preacher and speaker on Islam and Muslims. He is the former Executive Director of a national Muslim organization, the Muslim American Society. He is the former president of the Muslim American Society – Boston Chapter, and a trustee of the Interreligious Center on Public Life (ICPL). He is a signatory of the "Building a Community of Trust" declaration of peace, affirming a positive relation between Jews and Muslims and the right of both people to live and prosper in Israel/Palestine. AlJabri is a speaker in national conferences, such as the MAS-ICNA national conventions.

== Biography ==
AlJabri migrated from Egypt to the US at the age of 12. He holds an Engineering degree, an MBA and a certificate in Nonprofit Strategic Management from Harvard University. He studied Islamic studies with traditional scholars, and in the Islamic American University, the American Open University, and Boston University.

== Community service ==
AlJbari serves on the following boards:

- Board of Directors, Muslim American Society Boston Chapter , and ISB Cultural Center.
- Board of Trustees, the Interreligious Center on Public Life (ICPL).
- Board of Directors, Common Ground.
- Board of Advisors, RUAH.
- Board of Advisors Harvard University, Islam in the West Project, Boston Muslims Survey.

AlJabri is an alumnus of the FBI Citizens Academy and a member of BRIDGES forum, bringing law enforcement agencies and community leaders together for better understanding and service.

== Imam, Khatib ==
AlJabri is a regular Imam and Khatib, delivering the Friday Sermon in the following mosques and universities in Massachusetts:

- ISBCC , Roxbury.
- Islamic Center of Boston, Wayland
- Islamic Center of New England, Sharon
- Islamic Society of Boston, Cambridge
- Harvard University, Cambridge
- Boston University, Boston
- Longwood Medical Center, Boston
- MGH, Boston
- Al-Huda Society, Revere
- Islamic Center of Burlington, Burlington
