= Tunku Zain Al-'Abidin =

Malaysian prince (born 1982)

Tunku Zain Al-'Abidin تونكو زين العابدين
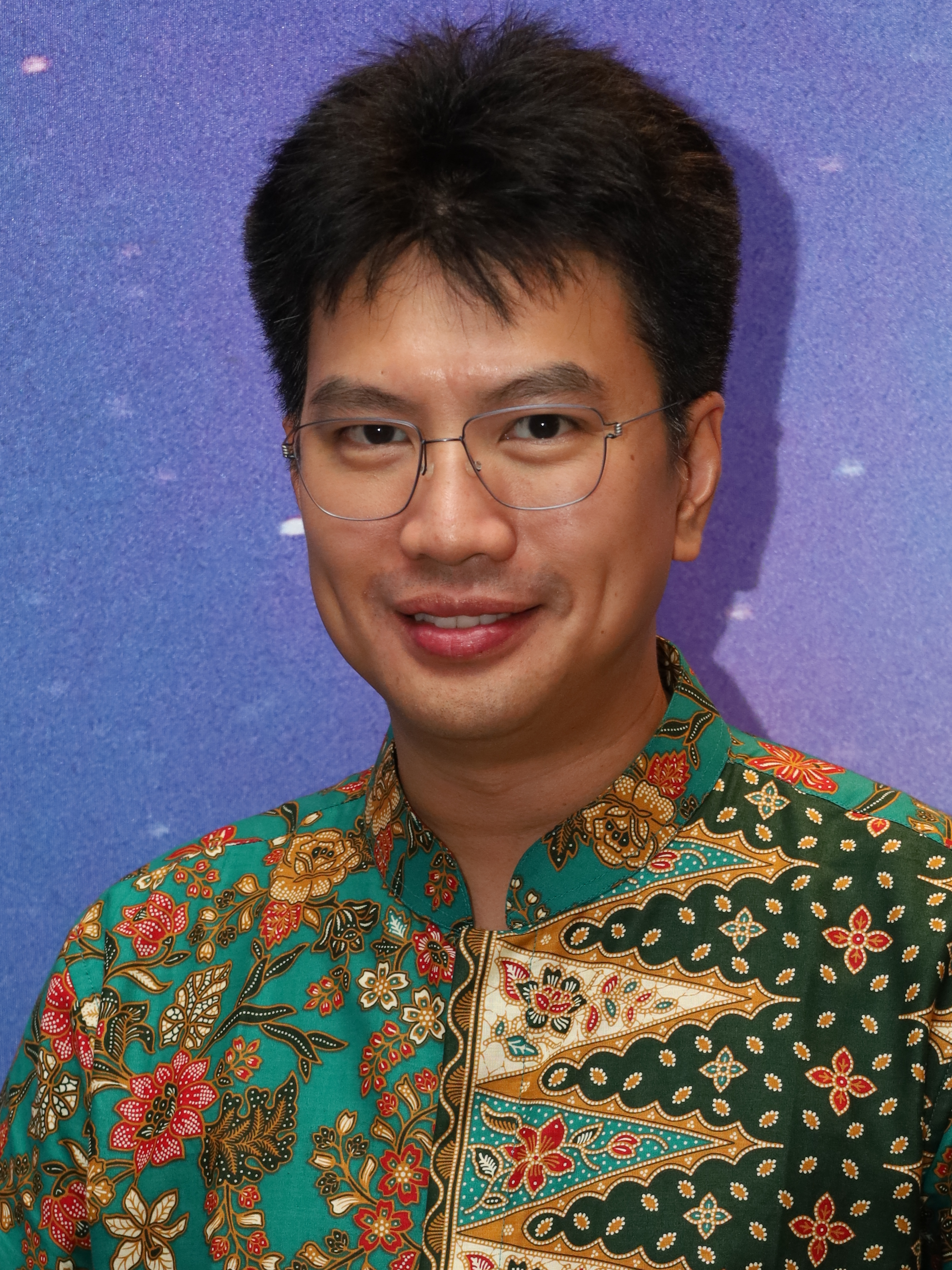
- Tunku Zain in 2025

Tunku Panglima Besar
- Tenure: 11 June 2026 – present
- Proclamation: 11 June 2026
- Predecessor: Tunku Nadzaruddin
- Born: 6 July 1982 (age 44); University Hospital, Selangor, Malaysia
- House: Pagaruyung
- Father: Tuanku Muhriz
- Mother: Tuanku Aishah Rohani
- Religion: Sunni Islam
- Education: Alice Smith School: Marlborough College; London School of Economics (BSc; MSc)
- Military career
- Branch: Malaysian Army
- Rank: Colonel
- Unit: Rejimen Askar Wataniah

Tunku Zain Al-'Abidin ibni Tuanku Muhriz (Note: Jawi: تونكو زين العابدين ابن توانكو محرز) (born 6 July 1982) is a member of the Negeri Sembilan royal family who is the Tunku Panglima Besar. He is the second son of the reigning Yang di-Pertuan Besar of Negeri Sembilan, Tuanku Muhriz ibni Almarhum Tuanku Munawir and the Tunku Ampuan Besar of Negeri Sembilan, Tuanku Aishah Rohani binti Almarhum Tengku Besar Mahmud. He is also the founding president of the Institute for Democracy and Economic Affairs (IDEAS), and is actively involved in public policy advocacy. In addition to his work as a newspaper columnist, he serves on the boards of several businesses and non-profit organisations. His areas of focus include public policymaking, youth development, and nation-building.

== Early life and education ==
Tunku Zain Al-'Abidin was born on 6 July 1982 at University Hospital in Petaling Jaya, Selangor, during the reign of Tuanku Ja'afar. He is the second son of Tuanku Muhriz and Tuanku Aishah Rohani, and has two brothers: an elder, Tunku Ali Redhauddin, and a younger, Tunku Alif Hussein. He received his early education at the Alice Smith School in Kuala Lumpur and Marlborough College in the UK. He later pursued higher education at the London School of Economics and Political Science (LSE), earning a Bachelor of Science in government and sociology, followed by a Master of Science in comparative politics and imperial history.

== Public service ==
Tunku Zain began his career in public service holding positions at the Houses of Parliament and various think tanks in London before relocating to Washington, D.C., to work as a public sector consultant for the World Bank. In 2006, while still in London, he co-founded the Malaysian Think Tank with his friends Wan Saiful Wan Jan and Wan Mohd Firdaus Wan Mohd Fuaad. The organisation was created to promote classical liberal ideas in Malaysia and eventually evolved into the IDEAS after being relocated to Kuala Lumpur in 2009.

Following his return to Malaysia in 2008, Tunku Zain was employed by the United Nations Development Programme in Kuala Lumpur. That same year, he also began writing opinion columns that have appeared in five national newspapers. His current column, #abidinideas, is featured in The Star, Sin Chew, and Borneo Post. His essays have been compiled into three books, one of which was nominated for a Popular Readers' Choice Award. He also authored a commemorative coffee table book for the installation of the 11th Yang di-Pertuan Besar of Negeri Sembilan.

In 2009, the organisation was renamed IDEAS and relocated to Malaysia, where it received a positive response for its inaugural event on press freedom, which helped spark wider public interest in policy debates. As the organisation grew, it expanded its initiatives guided by the Merdeka values and the principles of Malaysia's first prime minister, Tunku Abdul Rahman. Under Tunku Zain's leadership, IDEAS has contributed significantly to parliamentary development and education reform. Alongside his work with IDEAS, Tunku Zain has maintained a strong presence in public discourse, consistently writing the column Abiding Times in The Sun since March 2008. He also served as a research fellow at the Lee Kuan Yew School of Public Policy, National University of Singapore, from March 2009 to August 2010.

Tuanku Muhriz (wearing the white mask), Tuanku Aishah Rohani (his left side), Muhammed Abdullah (his right side) and Tunku Syed Razman watching the funeral of Tunku Ampuan Najihah on 8 September 2023. Behind Tuanku Muhriz, there were Tunku Nadzaruddin, talking with a group of people and Tunku Zain Al-'Abidin (yawning).

Tunku Zain played a leading role in the restoration of the state anthem, Berkatlah Yang DiPertuan Besar Negeri Sembilan, which was revamped in October 2010. A passionate music enthusiast, he collaborated with music teacher Chong Yew Boon and composer Johari Salleh to create a more vibrant and standardised version of the anthem. After extensive research and experimentation with various musical interpretations, he developed multiple arrangements suitable for different settings, including orchestral, school choir, and military band performances. His goal was to preserve the anthem's original melody and lyrics while inspiring greater respect and pride, particularly among the younger generation. Beyond this, he has been a key figure in the development of ICAN College since 2012 and, in May 2017, was appointed the first royal patron of the percussion ensemble Hands Percussion.

Tunku Zain was appointed pro-chancellor of UCSI University in 2021, a role in which he made notable contributions to the development of its Bangladesh branch campus and helped expand the university’s international research collaborations through various overseas initiatives. In April that same year, he and his brother, Tunku Ali Redhauddin, collaborated with The 10 Ringgit Project to support B40 families in Negeri Sembilan, raising funds through Yayasan Munarah to provide essential aid. As chairman of General Assembly Malaysia, Tunku Zain also spearheaded the MySTEP Programme 2021, which aimed to equip unemployed Malaysians with digital skills to enhance their employability during the COVID-19 lockdown. Since 2023, he has served as advisor to the UCSI Group. In early 2025, he was appointed patron of UCSI Hospital, and on 14 May that year, he was officially installed as the university's second chancellor.

== Personal life ==
Tunku Zain is a pianist, having performed or recorded with several ensembles and musicians including the UiTM Chamber Choir, Malaysian Philharmonic Orchestra, and Mei Yi Foo. Beyond music, he enjoys tennis and squash, and currently serves as president of the Negeri Sembilan Squash Association.

== Tunku Panglima Besar ==
Tunku Zain was proclaimed as the Tunku Panglima Besar by his father, Tuanku Muhriz at the Bailarong Seri, Istana Besar Seri Menanti, on 11 June 2026. This followed the relinquishing of the title by the previous holder, Tunku Nadzaruddin, in his attempt to assume the title of Yamtuan Besar on 5 June. The position of Tunku Panglima Besar is the fourth of the Putera Yang Empat positions held in the Negeri Sembilan royal family.

== Titles, styles and honours ==
Styles of Tunku Zain Al-'Abidin
- Reference style: His Highness
- Spoken style: Your Highness
- Alternative style: Tunku

- 6 July 1982 – 28 December 2008: His Highness Tunku Zain Al-'Abidin bin Tunku Muhriz
- 29 December 2008 – 13 January 2018: His Highness Tunku Zain Al-'Abidin ibni Tuanku Muhriz
- 14 January 2018 – 10 June 2026: His Highness Tunku Dato' Seri Zain Al-'Abidin ibni Tuanku Muhriz
- 11 June 2026 – present: His Highness Tunku Dato' Seri Zain Al-'Abidin ibni Tuanku Muhriz, Tunku Panglima Besar

The styles of Tunku Zain Al-'Abidin is:

His Highness Tunku Dato' Seri Zain Al-'Abidin ibni Tuanku Muhriz, Tunku Panglima Besar

=== Honours ===
- Negeri Sembilan
  - Royal Family Order of Yamtuan Radin Sunnah (DKYR; 20 October 2009)
  - Knight Grand Companion of the Order of Loyalty to Tuanku Muhriz (SSTM; 14 January 2018) – Dato' Seri
  - Recipient of the Tuanku Muhriz Installation Medal (26 October 2009)

=== Malaysia ===
- Malaysia
  - Recipient of the 14th Yang di-Pertuan Agong Installation Medal (11 April 2012)
  - Recipient of the 15th Yang di-Pertuan Agong Installation Medal (24 April 2017)
  - Recipient of the 16th Yang di-Pertuan Agong Installation Medal (30 July 2019)
  - Recipient of the 17th Yang di-Pertuan Agong Installation Medal (20 July 2024)
- Kedah
  - Recipient of the Sultan Sallehuddin Installation Medal (22 October 2018)
- Perak
  - Recipient of the Sultan Azlan Shah Silver Jubilee Medal (2009)

== Books ==
Tunku Zain has authored four books to date:

- YAM Tuanku Zain Al-'Abidin Ibni Tuanku Muhriz (2009). Payung berdaulat warisan beradat : Istiadat pertabalan Duli Yang Maha Mulia Yang Di-Pertuan Besar Negeri Sembilan Darul Khusus Tuanku Muhriz Ibni Almarhum Tuanku Munawir. Negeri Sembilan: Istana Hinggap.
- Tunku Zain al-'Abidin Muhriz (2011). Abiding Times. Vol. 1. Tarrytown: Marshall Cavendish Editions. ISBN 978-967-303-552-6.
- Tunku Zain al-'Abidin Muhriz (2012). Abiding Times 2: An Insight into the Minds of Malaysia's Thinking Youth. Singapore: Marshall Cavendish Editions. ISBN 978-981-4382-39-7.
- Tunku 'Abidin Muhriz (2014). Roaming Beyond the Fence. Singapore: Editions Didier Millet. ISBN 978-981-4385-60-2.

== Notes ==
Malaysian royalty
Preceded by Tunku Ali Redhauddin Muhriz	Line of succession to the throne of Negeri Sembilan; 2nd position	Succeeded by Tunku Naquiyuddin
