= MSC Malaysia =

Economic corridor in Greater Kuala Lumpur

MSC Malaysia Koridor Raya Multimedia
- Special economic zone
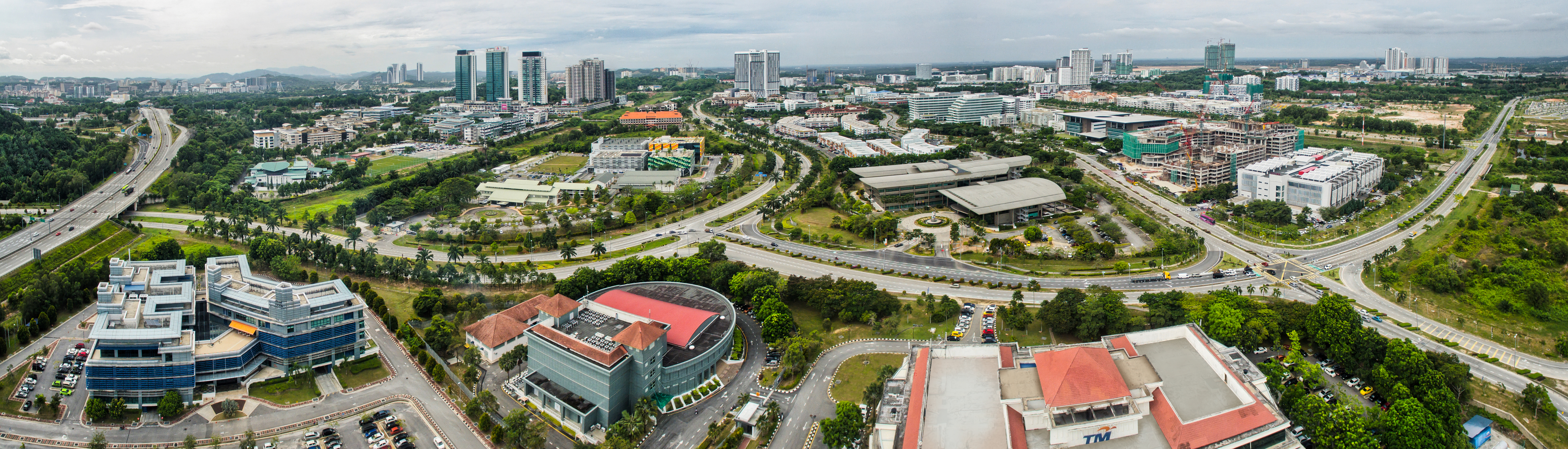
- Cyberjaya, the centrepiece of MSC Malaysia

- Logo
- Country: Malaysia
- States and federal territories: Kuala Lumpur; Putrajaya; Selangor; Negeri Sembilan; Johor
- Created: 12 February 1996; 30 years ago

MSC Malaysia, formerly known as the Multimedia Super Corridor (MSC; Malay: Koridor Raya Multimedia), is a special economic zone and high-technology business district spanning the federal territories of Kuala Lumpur and Putrajaya, south-central Selangor, parts of western Negeri Sembilan and southern Johor, Malaysia.

== Geographical definition ==
The MSC proper spans Petronas Towers in downtown Kuala Lumpur, extending through Cyberjaya, Putrajaya, the Kuala Lumpur International Airport and most of Sepang constituency, as well as parts of Bandar Tun Razak, Puchong and Serdang constituencies, before terminating at Nilai, Negeri Sembilan, which is part of the neighbouring Malaysia Vision Valley corridor.

The MSC also has an enclave within the Iskandar Malaysia corridor in the southern state of Johor, known as the MSC Cyberport, established in 2006.

== History ==
The MSC program was officially inaugurated by the fourth Malaysian Prime Minister Mahathir Mohamad on 12 February 1996. The establishment of the program was crucial to accelerate the objectives of Vision 2020 and to transform Malaysia into a modern state by 2020, with the adoption of a knowledge-based society framework.

== Purpose ==
The MSC flagship applications were launched to boost the MSC Malaysia initiatives and to create a hub for innovative producers and users of multimedia technology. Consortia comprising local and foreign companies (MNCs) collaborated with government agencies, departments and ministries to enhance the socio-economic development of Malaysia in the information age. The vision and mission of the Multimedia Super Corridor (MSC) as expressed by Dr Mahathir Mohammad, the Prime Minister of Malaysia at the time (1981–2003), is essentially this:

MSC is paramount to leapfrog (Malaysia) into the 21st century and to achieve Malaysia's Vision 2020, the MSC was created to endeavour the best environment to harness the full potential of the multimedia without any artificial limits. MSC is a global test bed (hub), where the limits of the possible can be explored, and new ways of living, working, and playing in the new area of the Information Age.

The Multimedia Super Corridor is a government-designated zone in designed to leapfrog Malaysia into the information and knowledge age. It aims to attract companies with temporary tax breaks and facilities such as high-speed Internet access and proximity to the Kuala Lumpur International Airport.

MSC Malaysia covers an area of approximately 15 km (9.3 mi) × 50 km (31 mi) (that is, 750 km^{2} (290 mi^{2})) stretching from the Petronas Towers to the Kuala Lumpur International Airport, and including the towns of Putrajaya and Cyberjaya.

It was announced by former Prime Minister Mahathir Mohamad at the Multimedia Asia Conference on 1 August 1996. Mahathir's visit to the United States of America in January 1997 to promote the MSC to companies succeeded in attracting the interest of many large information technology companies. During the visit, an international advisory panel comprising 30 information technology experts were formed to exchange ideas toward the success of the MSC.

The Multimedia Development Corporation (MDeC, formerly MDC) was created to oversee development of the MSC. It was later renamed to Malaysia Digital Economy Corporation (MDEC).

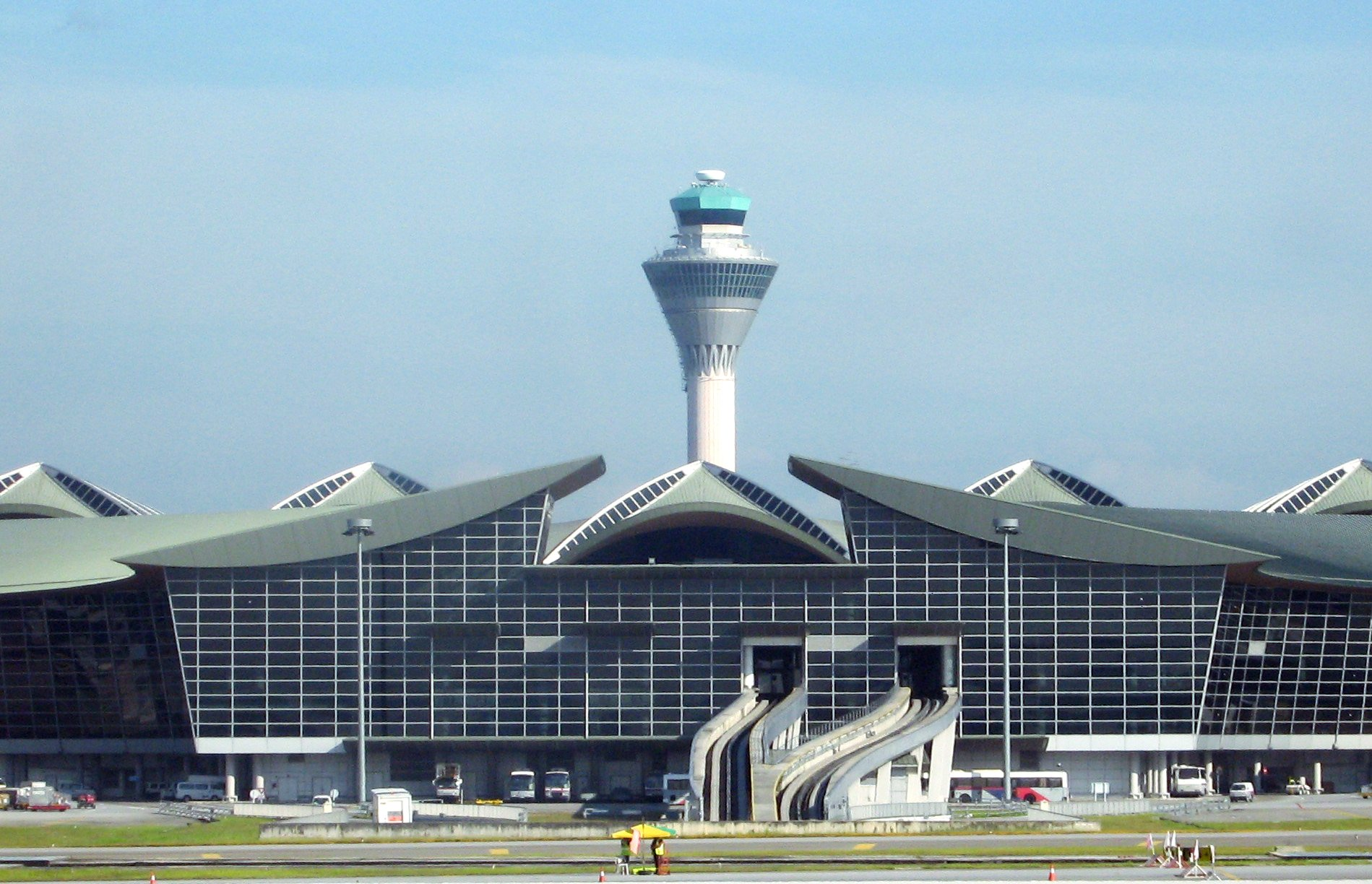
Kuala Lumpur International Airport at the south border

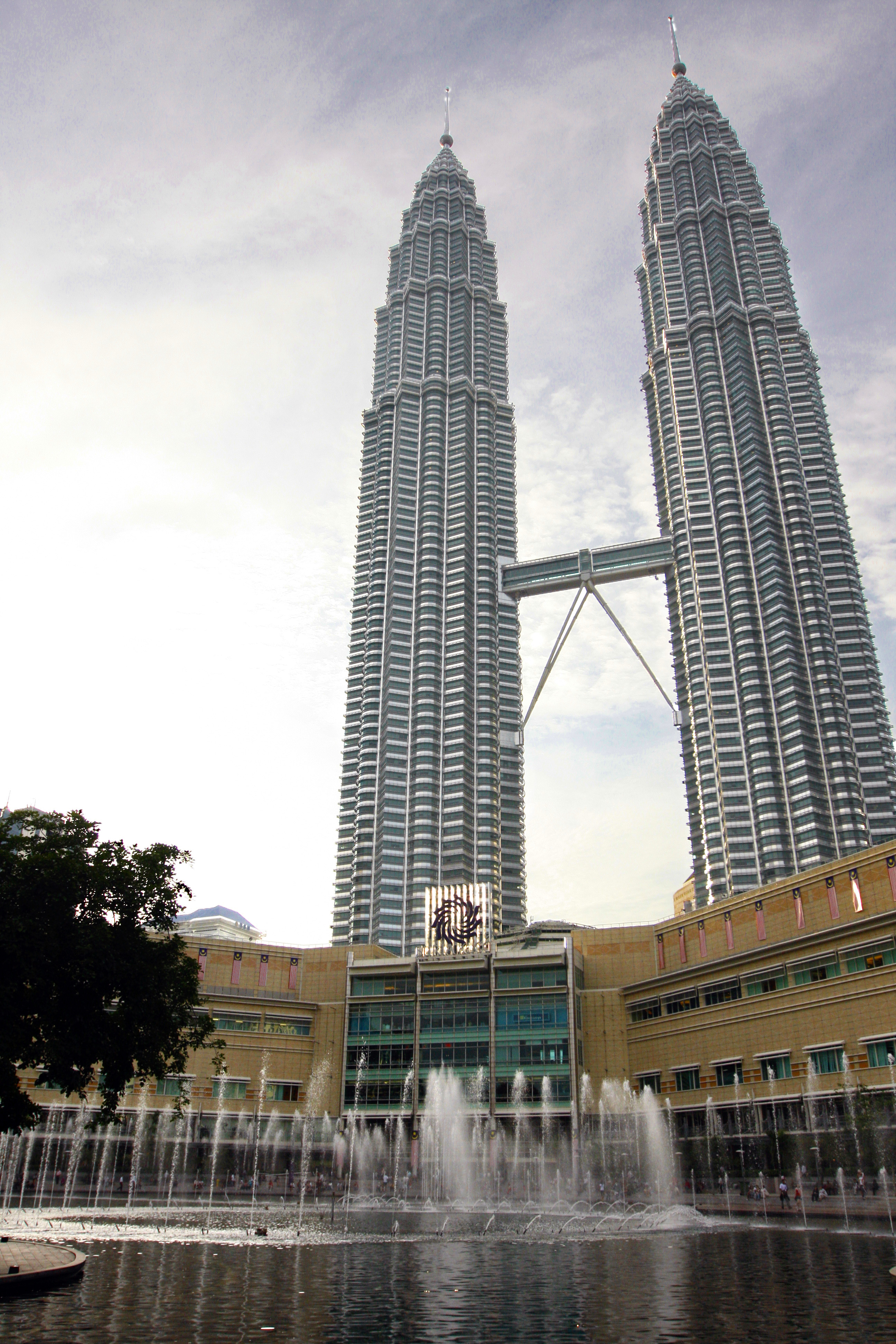
Petronas Towers at the north border

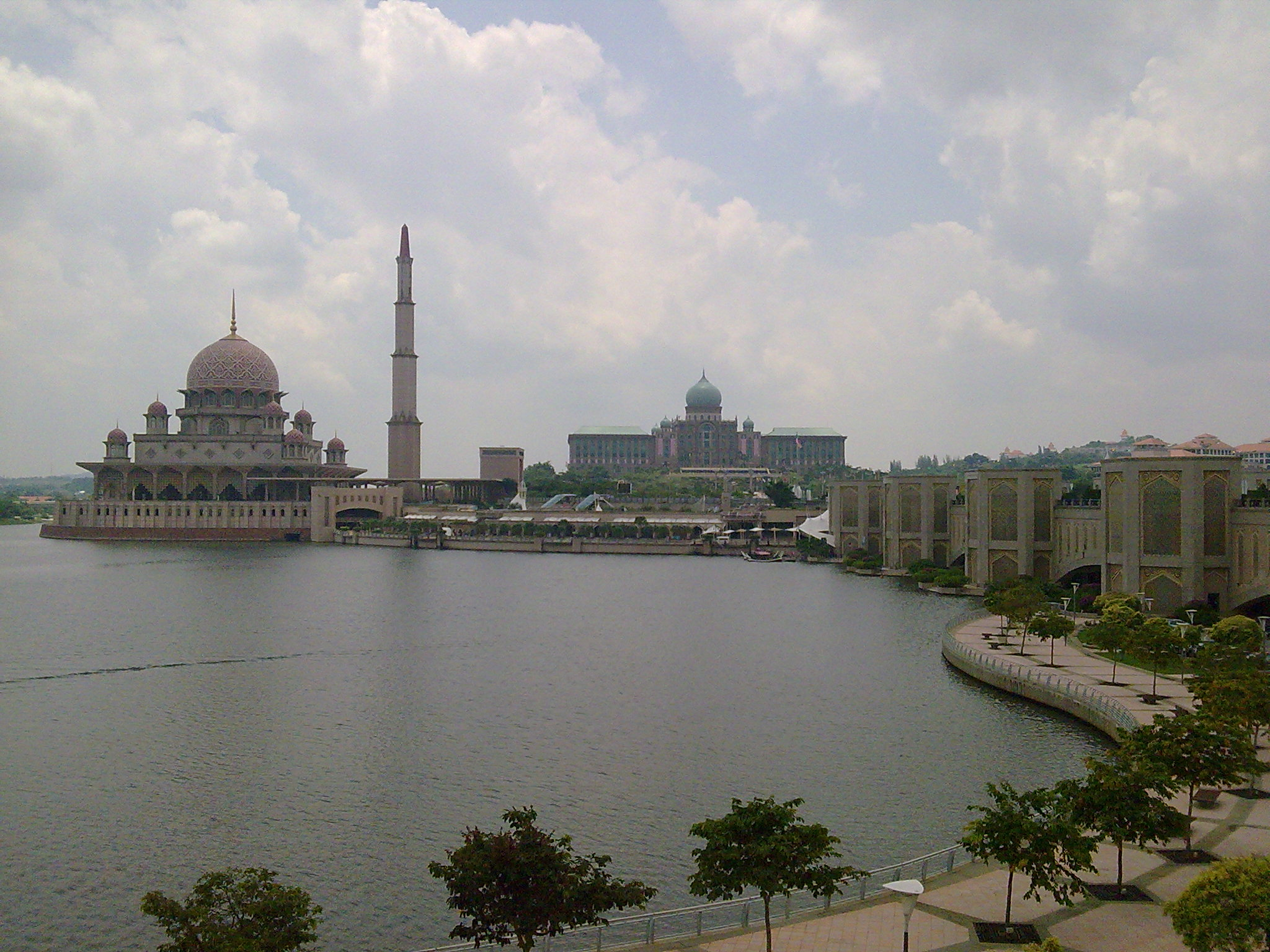
Putrajaya

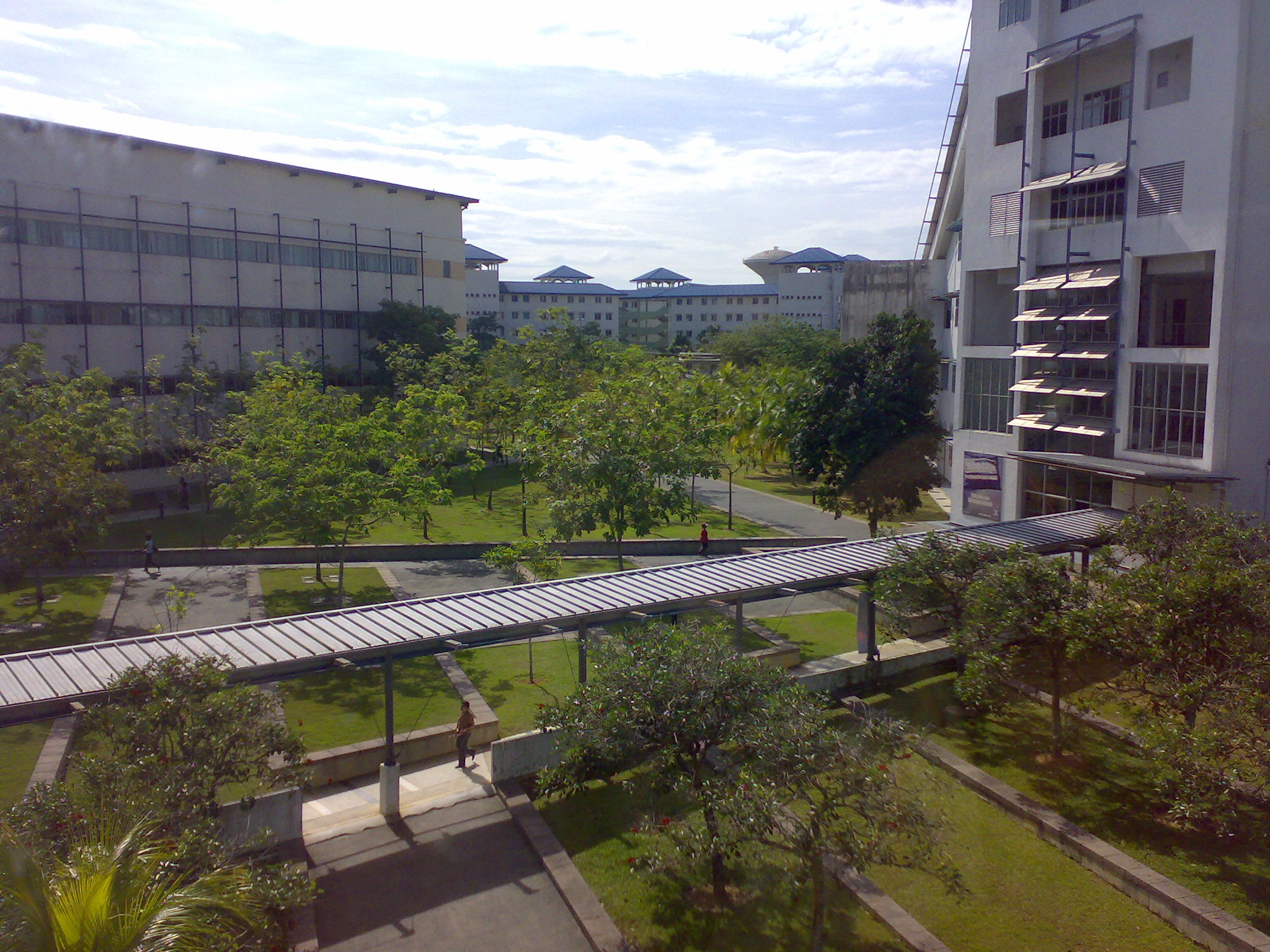
Cyberjaya

== Effects on press freedom ==
Though Malaysian law had provided for strict government controls on print media since 1984, a founding principle of MSC Malaysia was that government censorship of the Internet would not be permitted. Seeing a loophole, journalist Steven Gan and colleague Premesh Chandran started an online news resource that would be free of the controls that they felt stifled print media. In November 1999, the pair founded Malaysiakini, an online, independent news source that would become one of Malaysia's most popular websites. It was awarded a Free Media Pioneer award from the International Press Institute in 2001, and Gan was awarded one of the 2000 CPJ International Press Freedom Awards for his work with the site.

== MSC status companies ==
Since 1997, Malaysian and foreign companies could apply for MSC status. Those approved were provided with a certificate signed by two government ministers listing additional rights and benefits for that company. By 2017 there were over 3000 MSC status companies. Benefits included exemption from Malaysian income tax for ten years, and streamlined immigration of key workers. The first few companies awarded MSC status included Telekom, Intel and Oracle.

== Depictions ==
The reverse side of the 1996 series RM5 banknote featured a map of the Multimedia Super Corridor.

== See also ==
- Malaysian national projects
- Science and technology in Malaysia

Special economic zones in Malaysia

- East Coast Economic Region (ECER)
- Iskandar Malaysia
  - Johor-Singapore Special Economic Zone (JS-SEZ)
  - Forest City Special Financial Zone (Forest City SFZ)
- Malaysia Vision Valley (MVV)
- Northern Corridor Economic Region (NCER)
  - The Greater Kedah 2050
- Sabah Development Corridor (SDC)
- Sarawak Corridor of Renewable Energy (SCORE)
