= Lembah Impiana =

Lembah Impiana

Lembah Impiana is a suburb of Kulim District, Kedah, Malaysia.

== Economy ==
The suburb has its own commercial hub where several cafés and restaurants can also be found.

Smoke BBQ Company

Sri Impiana Inn Motel

Surrounding Taman Lembah Impiana

== See also ==
- Butterworth–Kulim Expressway
- Northern Corridor Economic Region
- Penang
