= Malaysian national projects =

Malaysian national projects are major national projects that are important to the development of Malaysia. The following is a list from Malaysian independence in 1957 to the present.

== 1957–1963 ==
Malaysian Houses of Parliament, Kuala Lumpur (2006)

- Stadium Merdeka
- Klang Gates Dam
- Stadium Negara
- Malaysian Houses of Parliament
- National Museum

== 1963–1970 ==
- Subang International Airport
- Federal Highway
- National Mosque
- National Monument
- East–West Highway
- Angkasapuri

== 1971–1980 ==
- Kuantan Satellite Earth Station
- Temenggor Dam
- Karak Highway
- Kuala Lumpur–Seremban Expressway
- Komtar, George Town, Penang

== 1981–1990 ==
- North–South Expressway
- Penang Bridge
- Kenyir Dam
- Dayabumi Complex
- Petronas petroleum and gas refinery in Kerteh, Terengganu
- Sultan Ismail Power Station in Paka, Terengganu

== 1991–1999 ==
- Peninsula Gas Pipeline
- Double-tracking and electrification of Rawang–Ipoh train line
- KTM Komuter Central Sector
- Klang Valley LRT Lines 1 & 2
  - LRT Ampang & Sri Petaling Lines (then known as STAR LRT line)
  - LRT Kelana Jaya Line (then known as PUTRA LRT line)
- Kuala Lumpur International Airport (KLIA) – now known as Terminal 1
- Petronas Twin Towers
- Kuala Lumpur Tower
- Putrajaya
- Multimedia Super Corridor
- Bakun Dam
- Malaysia–Singapore Second Link
- National Sports Complex
- Menara Alor Setar
- Kuala Lumpur Sentral (KL Sentral)

== 2000–2009 ==
- Prasarana Malaysia
  - Rapid KL
- KL Monorail
- Express Rail Link (ERL)
- Stormwater Management and Road Tunnel (SMART Tunnel)
- AMJ Highway
- Second East–West Highway
- Bukit Putus Viaduct
- Southern International Gateway
- East Coast Expressway (phase 1)
- South Johor Development Projects under South Johor Economic Region (SJER)
- Northern Corridor Development Projects under Northern Corridor Economic Region (NCER)
- East Coast Development Projects under East Coast Economic Region (ECER)
- Sabah Development Projects under Sabah Development Corridor (SDC)
- Central Sarawak Development Projects under Sarawak Corridor of Renewable Energy (SCORE)

== 2010–2019 ==
- KLIA Terminal 2 (then known as klia2)
- Double-tracking and electrification of Ipoh–Padang Besar train line
- Double-tracking and electrification of Seremban–Gemas train line
- KTM ETS
- KTM Komuter Northern Sector
- Subang Airport rail link – KL Sentral-Terminal Skypark Line (then known as Skypark Link)
- East Coast Expressway (phase 2)
- KVMRT Line 1 (MRT Kajang Line) – (then known as MRT Sungai Buloh-Kajang Line)
- BRT Sunway Line
- Extensions for LRT Sri Petaling Line and LRT Kelana Jaya Line
- Bandar Universiti Pagoh
- Western Negeri Sembilan Development Projects under Malaysia Vision Valley (MVV)
- Penang Sentral
- Rawang Bypass
- JB Eastern Dispersal Link
- Senai–Desaru Expressway (SDE)
- Sultan Abdul Halim Muadzam Shah Bridge (Penang Second Bridge)

== 2020–2030 ==
Completed

- Bukit Bintang City Centre
- JENDELA Plan
- Merdeka 118
- Saloma Link
- Tun Razak Exchange
  - The Exchange 106
  - The Exchange TRX
- RAPID Pengerang
- KVMRT Line 2 (MRT Putrajaya Line)
- Klang Valley LRT Line 3 (LRT Shah Alam Line)
- Double-tracking and electrification of Gemas–Johor Bahru train line
- Damansara–Shah Alam Elevated Expressway (DASH)
- Setiawangsa-Pantai Expressway (SPE)
- Sungai Besi–Ulu Klang Elevated Expressway (SUKE)

Pending

- Bandar Malaysia
- Forest City
- Melaka Gateway
- Central Spine Road
- Pan Borneo Highway
- Kuala Lumpur–Singapore high-speed rail
- MRL East Coast Rail Link
- Johor Bahru–Singapore Rapid Transit System (RTS Link)
- KVMRT Line 3 (MRT Circle Line)
- LRT Mutiara Line
- East Klang Valley Expressway (EKVE)
- Kota Bharu–Kuala Krai Expressway
- South Kedah Expressway (SPIKE)
- West Coast Expressway (WCE)
- Tower M
