= East Coast Economic Region =

Special economic zone encompassing the east coastal region of Peninsular Malaysia

East Coast Economic Region Wilayah Ekonomi Pantai Timur
- Special economic zone
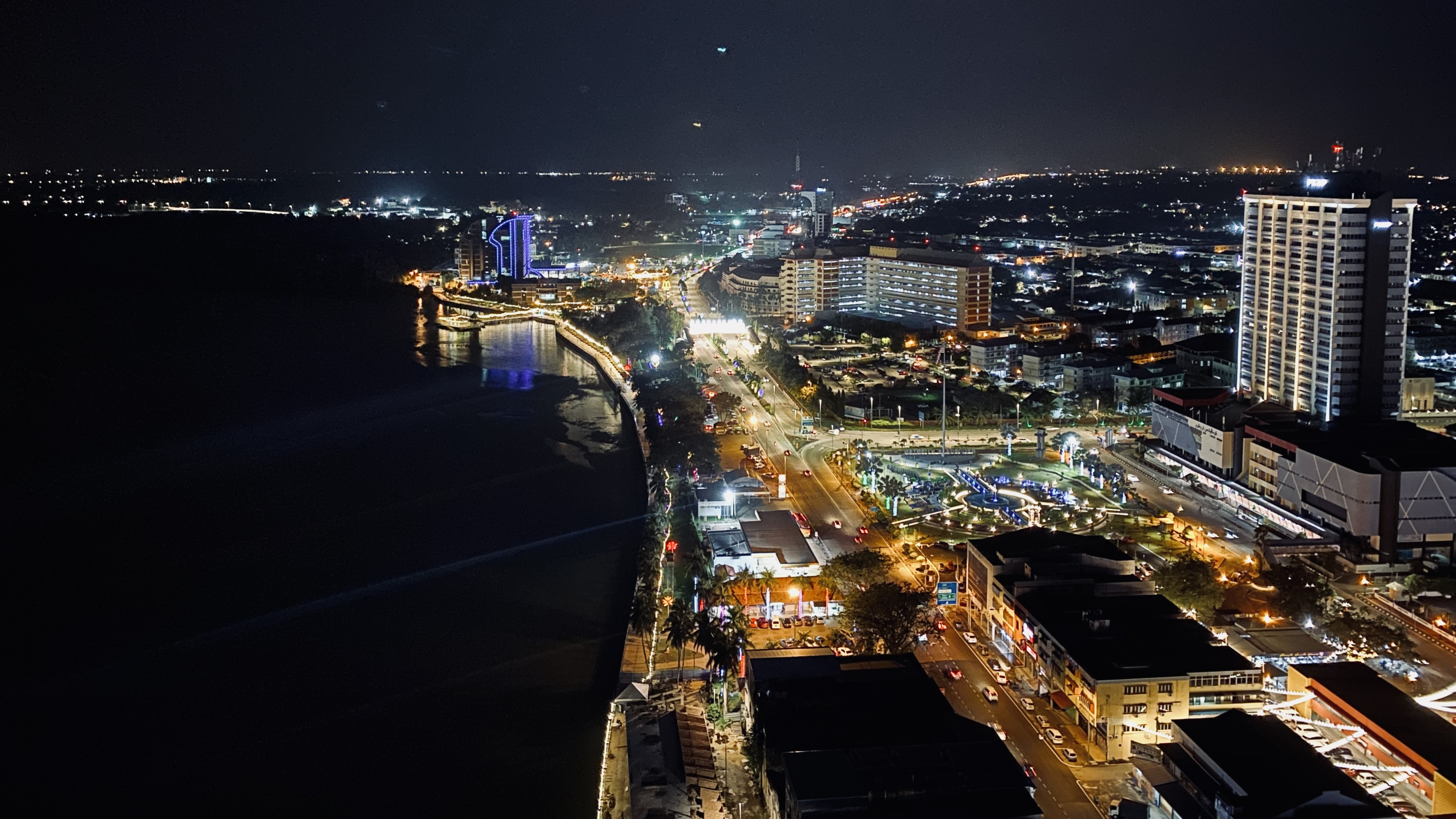
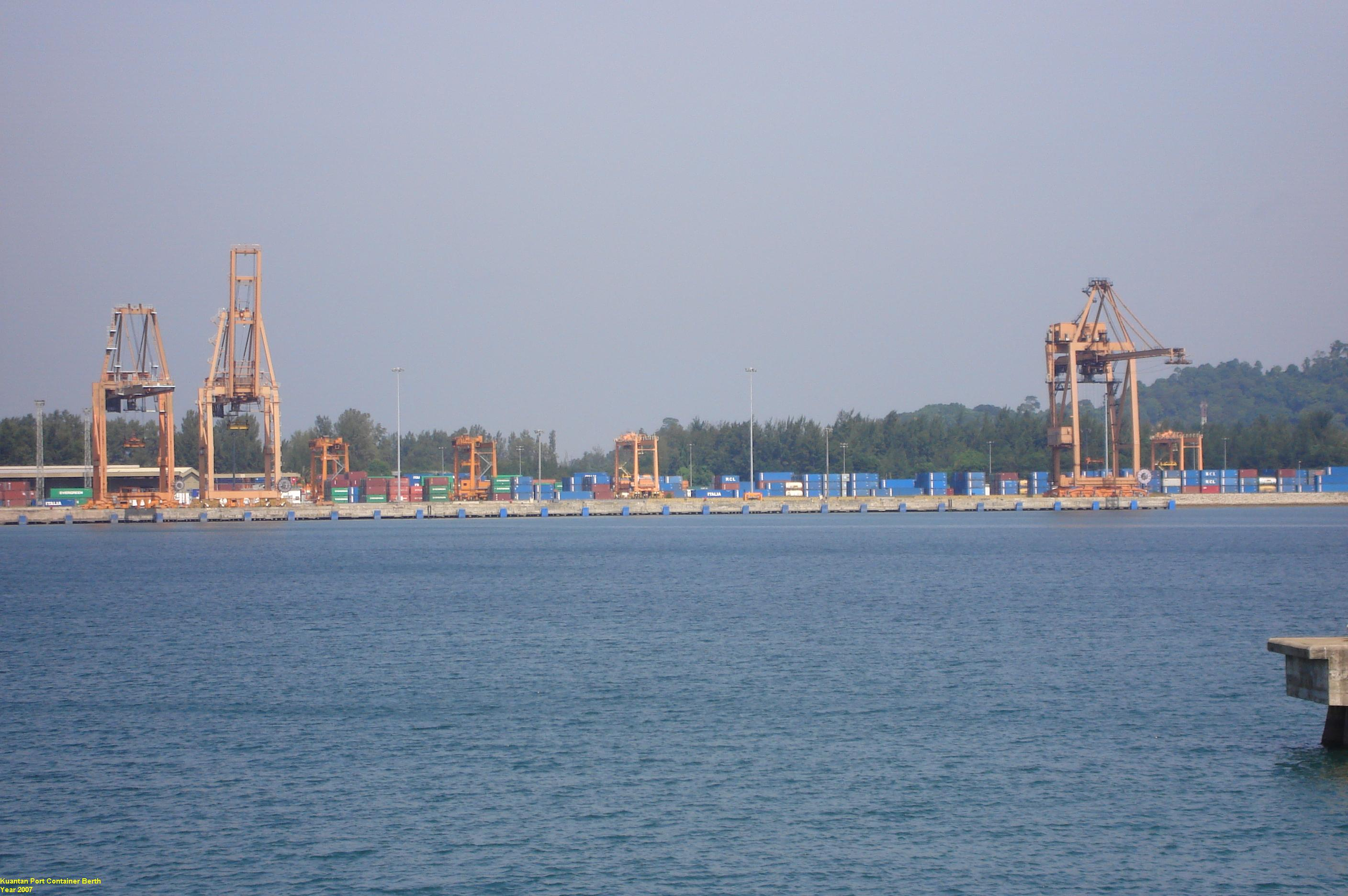
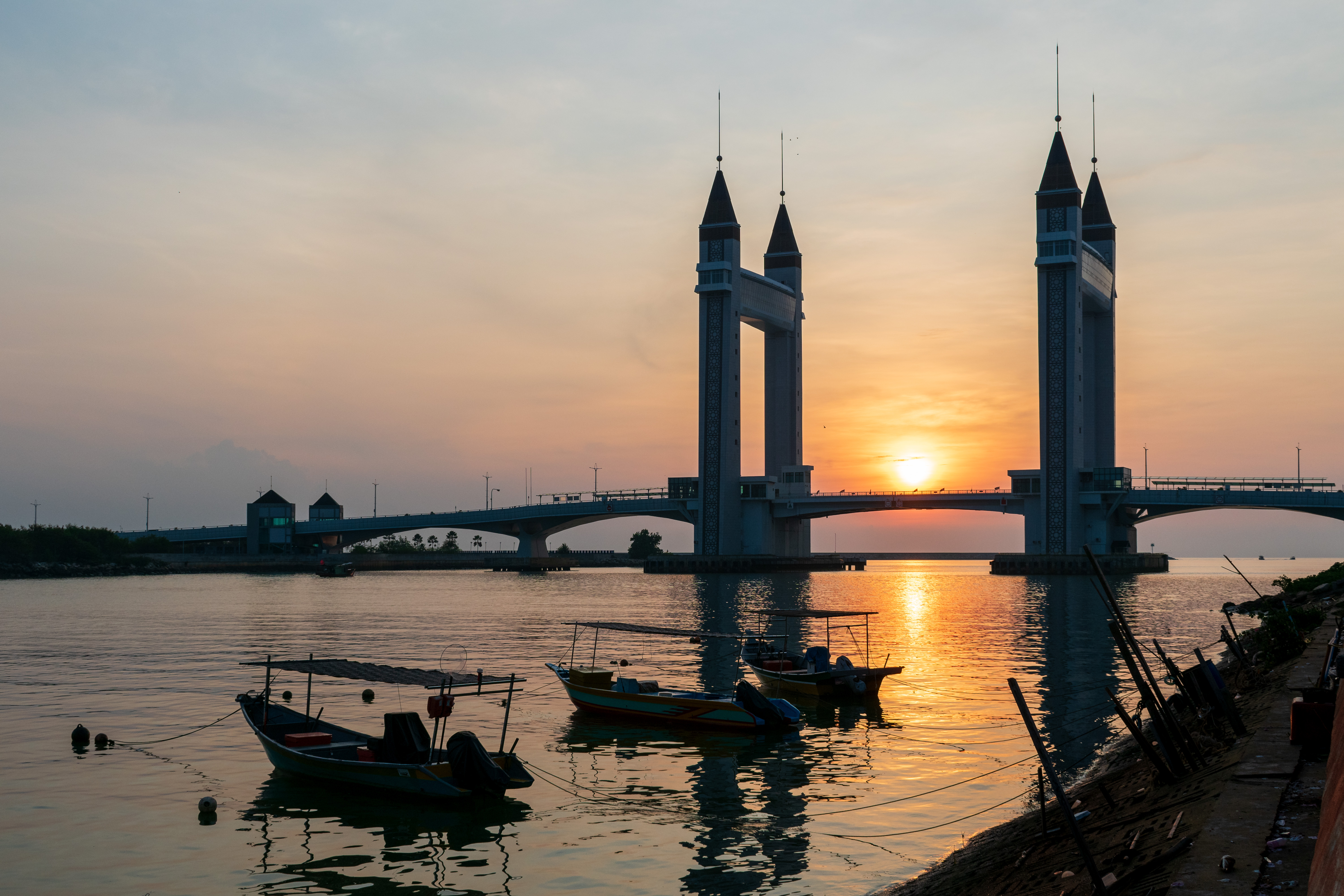
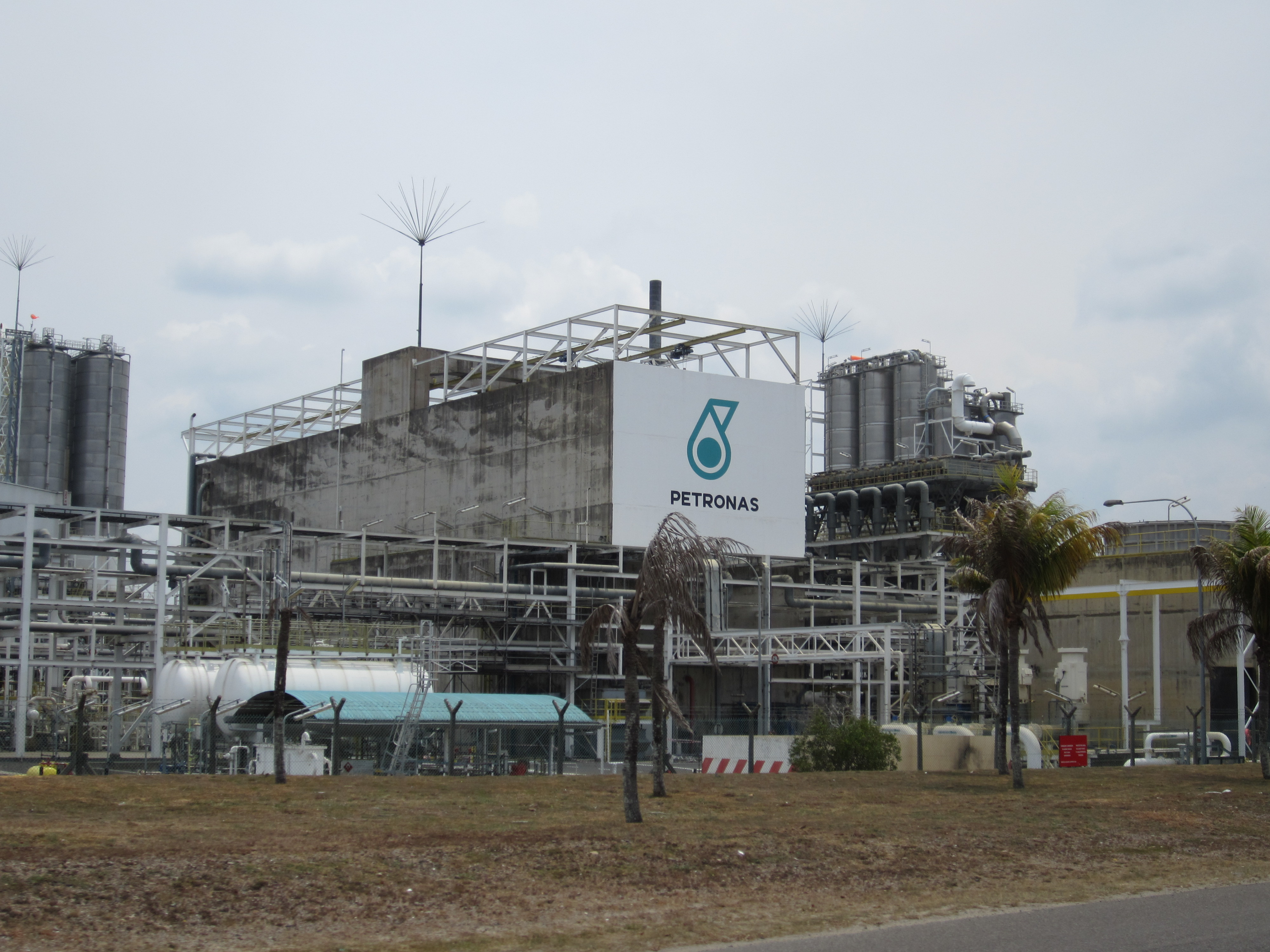
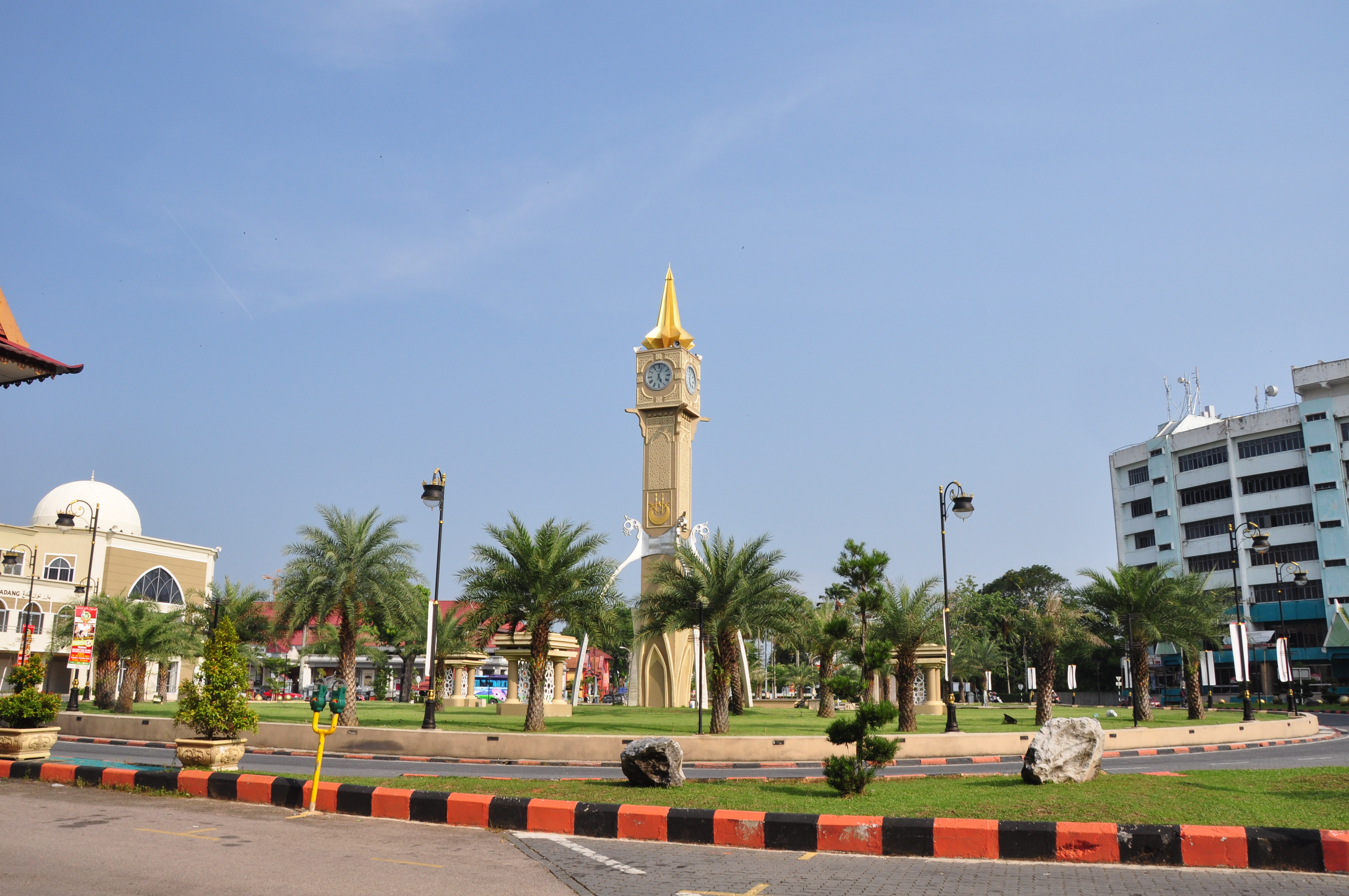
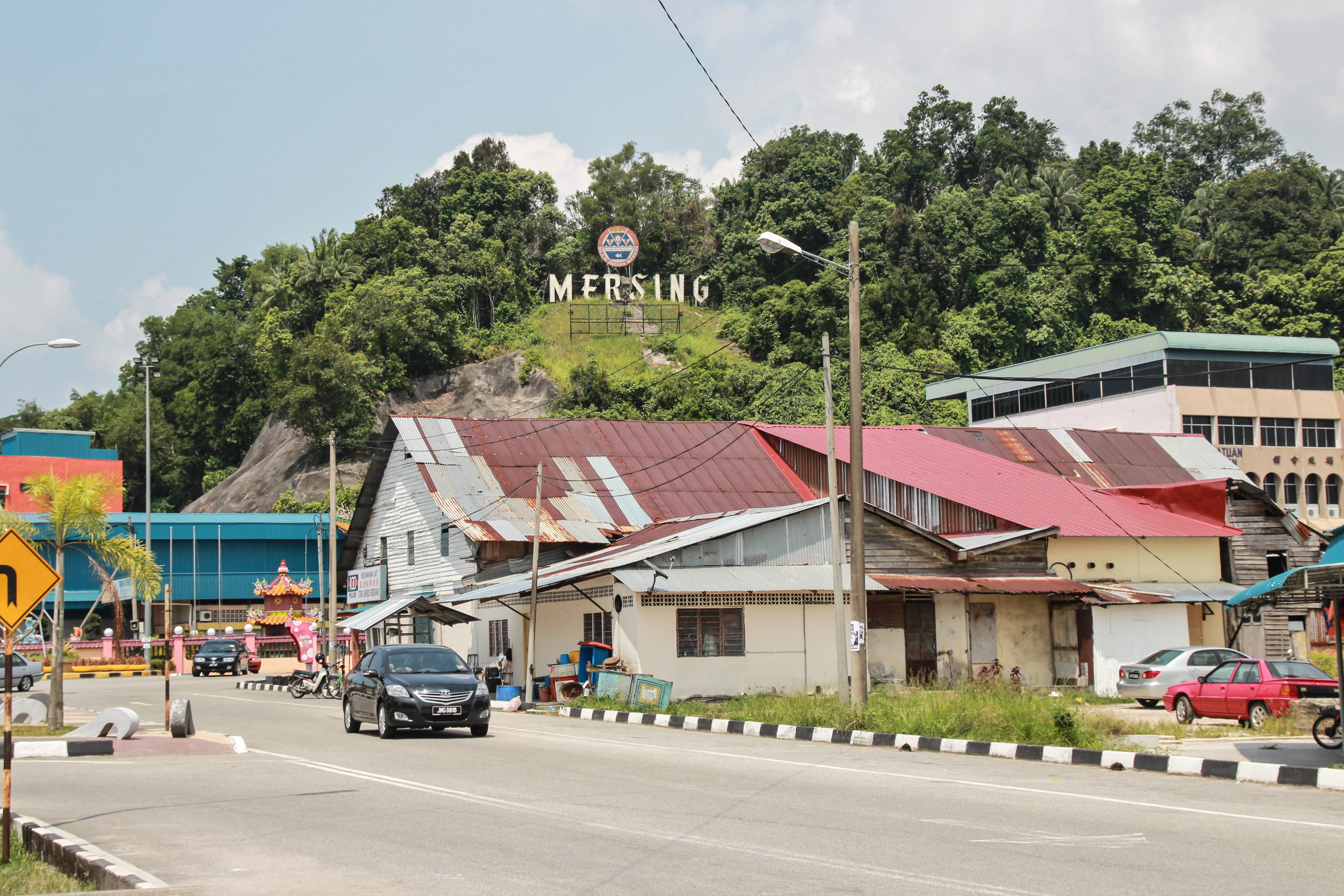
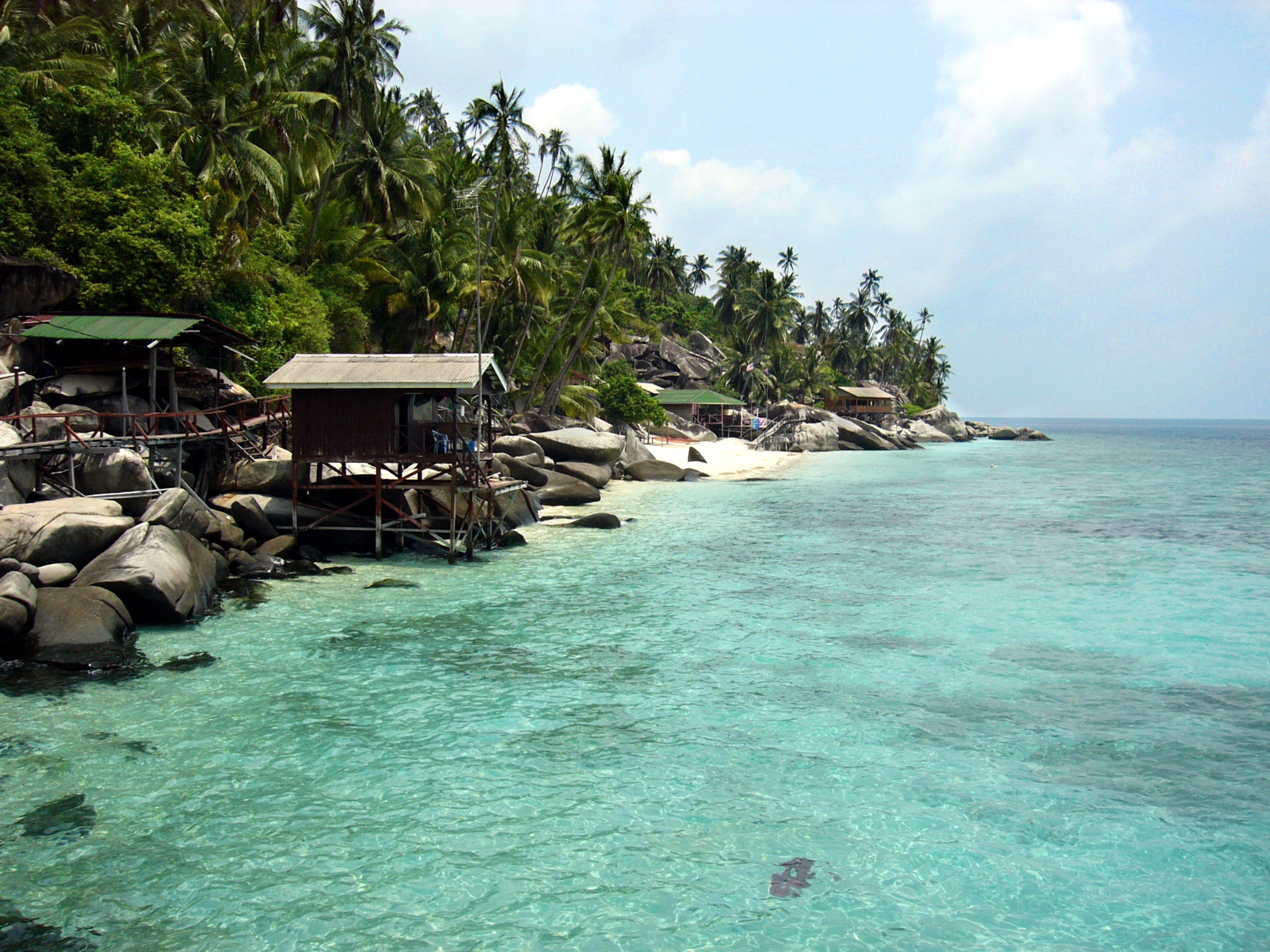
- From top, left to right: Kuantan, Kuantan Port, Kuala Terengganu Drawbridge, Petronas refinery at Kerteh, Kota Bharu, Mersing and Aur Island
- Country: Malaysia
- State: Johor, Kelantan, Pahang and Terengganu
- Launched: 30-31 October 2007

Government
  - Statutory body: East Coast Economic Region Development Council (ECERDC)
  - Chairman: Anwar Ibrahim
  - Chief Executive Officer: Baidzawi Che Mat
  - Chief Operating Officer: Ragu Sampasivam

Area
  - Total: 78,301 km^{2} (30,232 sq mi)
- Website: https://www.ecerdc.com.my/ecerdc/

The East Coast Economic Region (ECER; Malay: Wilayah Ekonomi Pantai Timur) is an economic development region based on the east coast of Peninsular Malaysia, which covers the states of Kelantan, Terengganu, and Pahang, and the Johorean districts of Mersing and Segamat. ECER is also one of the three economic corridors launched in Peninsular Malaysia under the leadership of Abdullah Ahmad Badawi, the fifth Prime Minister of Malaysia. The other corridors are Iskandar Malaysia in Johor and the Northern Corridor Economic Region (NCER) that covers the states of Penang, Kedah, Perlis and Perak. The ECER development program spans 12 years, beginning in 2007, and involves Public-Private Participation (PPP).

The master planner for ECER is the state-owned oil and gas company, Petronas, while the other private sector partner is the plantation group IOI Group, a public listed company. Both Petronas and IOI have a strong presence in the East Coast. The East Coast Economic Region Development Council was established to implement the master plan.

The ECER was launched by Malaysia's Prime Minister, Abdullah Ahmad Badawi in Kuala Terengganu, the state capital of Terengganu and Kota Bharu, the state capital of Kelantan on 30 October 2007 and the following day in Kuantan, the state capital of Pahang. During the launch, the Prime Minister announced a RM 6 billion allocation as part of public investment in this development corridor. The investment is primarily in high-impact projects that will serve as catalysts for the socio-economic development of the region, which occupies almost half of Peninsular Malaysia, and lagged the West Coast states it in terms of income and investments.

Prime Minister Najib Abdul Razak, who succeeded Abdullah Ahmad Badawi in 2009, continued the Malaysian leadership's commitment to corridor development, incorporating it into his Government Transformation Plan to bring to pass Malaysia's vision to become a high income developed nation in 2020. Two strategic initiatives under his leadership are ECER Special Economic Zone (ECER SEZ) and Malaysia-China Kuantan Industrial Park. Both are a first-of-its-kind initiatives in Malaysia, with the objective of fast-forwarding the inflow of FDI and industrialisation in the region.

According to the 2013 ECERDC Annual Report, as the end of 2013 the region had attracted RM55.8 billion in investments, well past the halfway mark of ECER's target of RM110 billion by 2020. An estimated 55,000 job opportunities have also been created in the region since 2007.

== Projects involved ==
=== Transport ===
Currently, there is a Petronas owned railway track between Kerteh and Kuantan which is operated by Keretapi Tanah Melayu. The economic plan will:-

- Update the railway system and to connect railway line from Mentakab – Kuantan – Kuala Terengganu – Tanah Merah/Pasir Mas
- Update the railway system and to connect railway line from Tanah Merah/Pasir Mas – Butterworth and Kuala Lumpur – Mentakab

The East Coast Expressway phase 2, which will connect Kuantan and Kuala Terengganu is currently under construction. The development plan will increase the length of the expressway into two phases:-

- Phase 3 - Connection between Kuala Terengganu and Kota Bharu, ending in Pengkalan Kubor
- Phase 4 - Connection between Kuantan and Johor Bahru

Other development plans are:-

- Upgrading Central Spine Federal Road ( Kota Bharu - Gua Musang – Kuala Lipis – Karak – Kuala Pilah - Seremban )
- Upgrading current coastal roads and building new coastal roads.
- Upgrading current facilities of airport in Kuala Terengganu to international airport status.
- Upgrading current facilities of airports in Kuantan and Kota Bharu
- Expansion and upgrading of Kuantan and Kemaman Ports

=== Infrastructure ===
- Construction of Lebir Dam in Kelantan to ensure sufficient potable water supply
- Laying fiber optic cables along major towns
- Upgrade current facilities and constructing new ones to manage solid wastes
- Flood mitigation projects in Kelantan and Terengganu
- Protection against coastal erosion

== See also ==
- Economy of Malaysia
- Economy of Johor
- Iskandar Malaysia
- Kuantan
- Malaysia Vision Valley
- Malaysian national projects
- Ninth Malaysia Plan
- Northern Corridor Economic Region
- Sabah Development Corridor
- Sarawak Corridor of Renewable Energy
