= NCER =

NCER may refer to:

- National Center for Education Research, part of the Institute of Education Sciences
- Northern Corridor Economic Region, a development region in Malaysia
