= MSC Cyberport =

Malaysian IT public-private partnership

MSC Cyberport Sdn. Bhd.

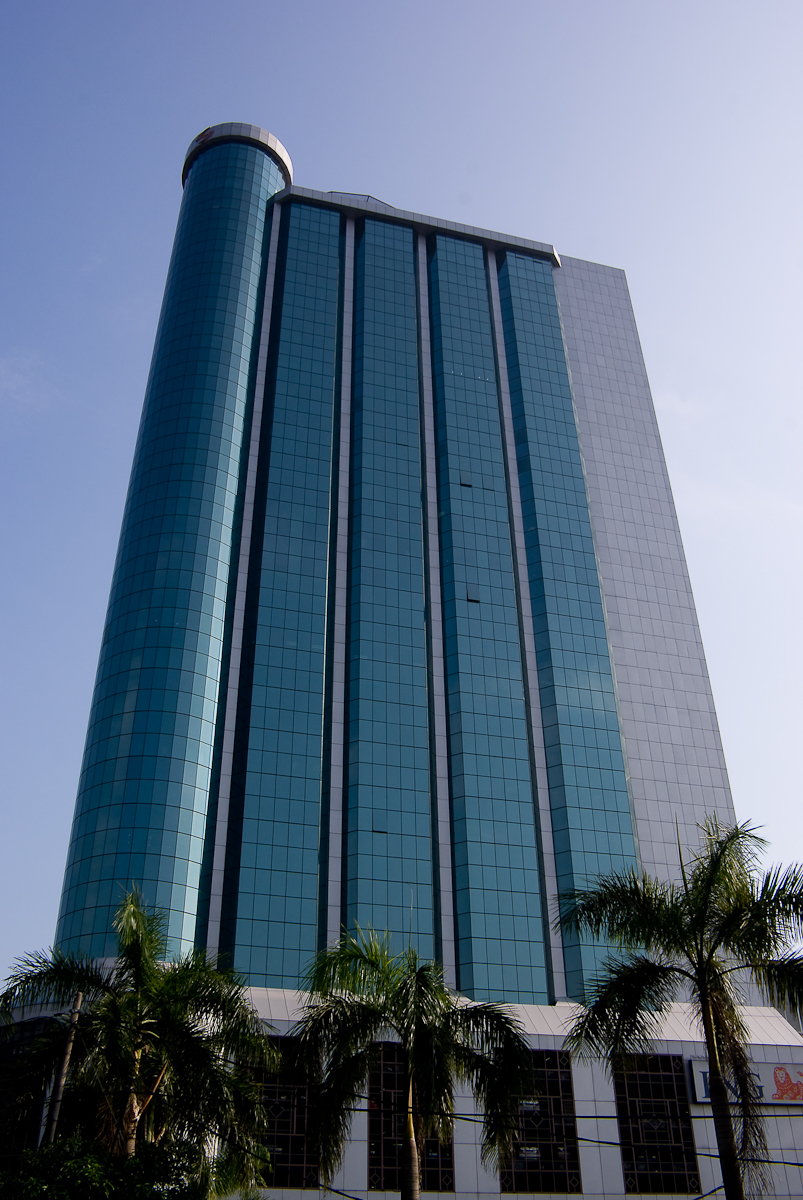
- MSC Cyberport Tower, Johor Bahru
- Company type: MSC Malaysia Cybercentre Management
- Industry: MSC Malaysia
- Founded: 2006
- Headquarters: Johor Bahru, Malaysia
- Key people: Ganesh Kumar Bangah
- Website: www.cyberport.com.my

MSC Cyberport Johor is a public-private partnership spearheaded by the State Government of Johor, Malaysia to create a global information and communication technology business hub for ICT companies from around the world within Iskandar Malaysia. It is part of the MSC Malaysia initiative of the Government of Malaysia.

== See also ==
- List of technology centers
- MSC Malaysia
