= The Greater Kedah 2050 =

State of Kedah 2050 vision by Muhammad Sanusi Md Nor

- Kedah Raya 2050
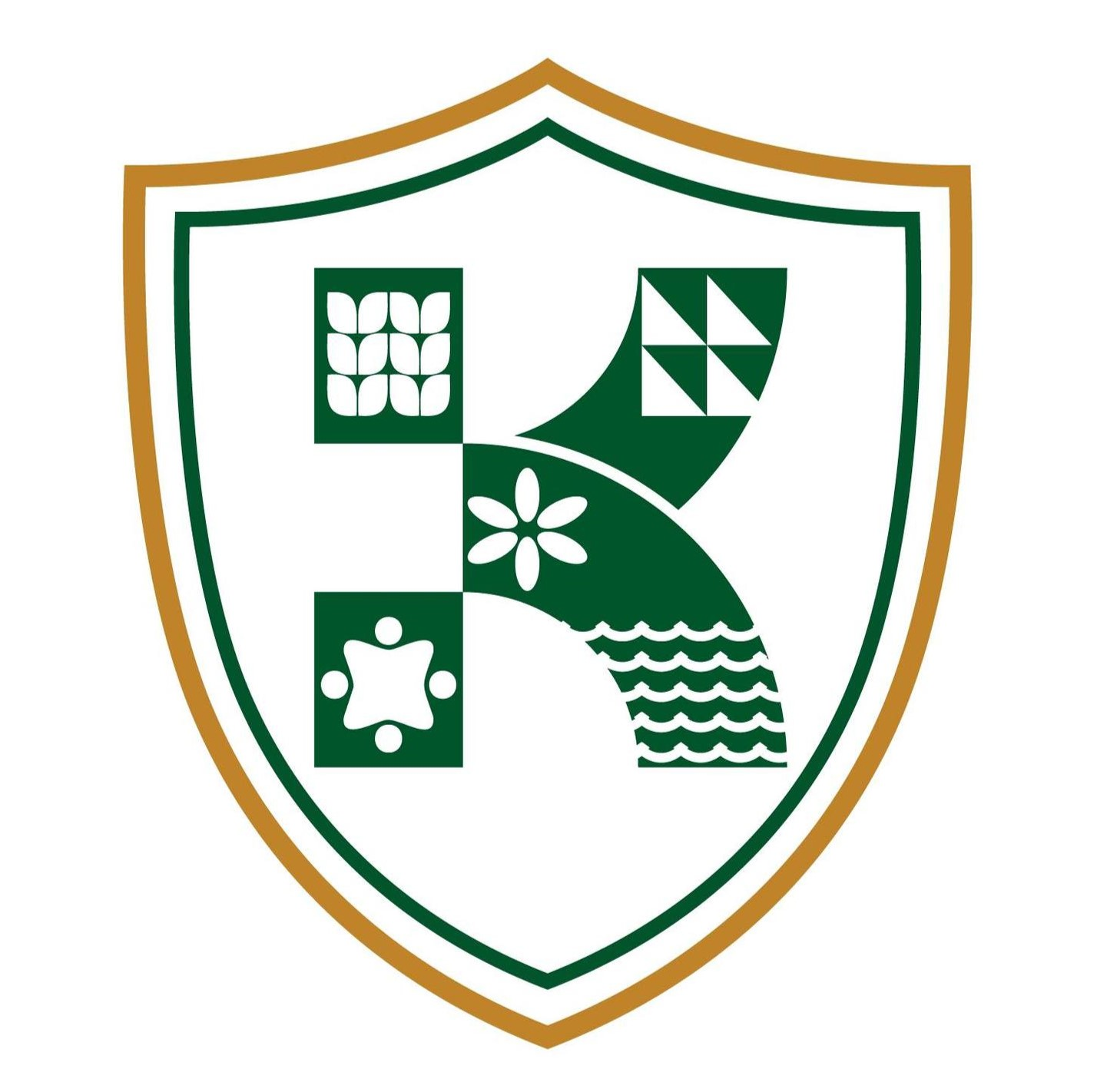

Development plan overview
- Formed: 27 October 2024
- Jurisdiction: Kedah State Government
- Minister responsible: Muhammad Sanusi Md Nor, Menteri Besar of Kedah
- Development plan executive: Haim Hilman Abdullah, Chairman of the Executive Committee
- Website: https://thegreaterkedah.gov.my

The Greater Kedah 2050 (Malay: Kedah Raya 2050), also known as The Greater Kedah 2050 vision (Malay: Wawasan Kedah Raya 2050), officially known as The Greater Kedah: Empowering Lives (Malay: Kedah Raya: Memperkasakan Kehidupan), is a long-term strategic development plan aimed at transforming the state of Kedah in Malaysia into a more industrialized, economically prosperous, and sustainable region by the year 2050. It envisions Kedah becoming a central economic hub in the northern region of Malaysia while maintaining its unique cultural, agricultural, and Malay–Islamic identity. It was officially launched by the Menteri Besar of Kedah, Muhammad Sanusi Md Nor in 2021, and relaunched back in 2024.

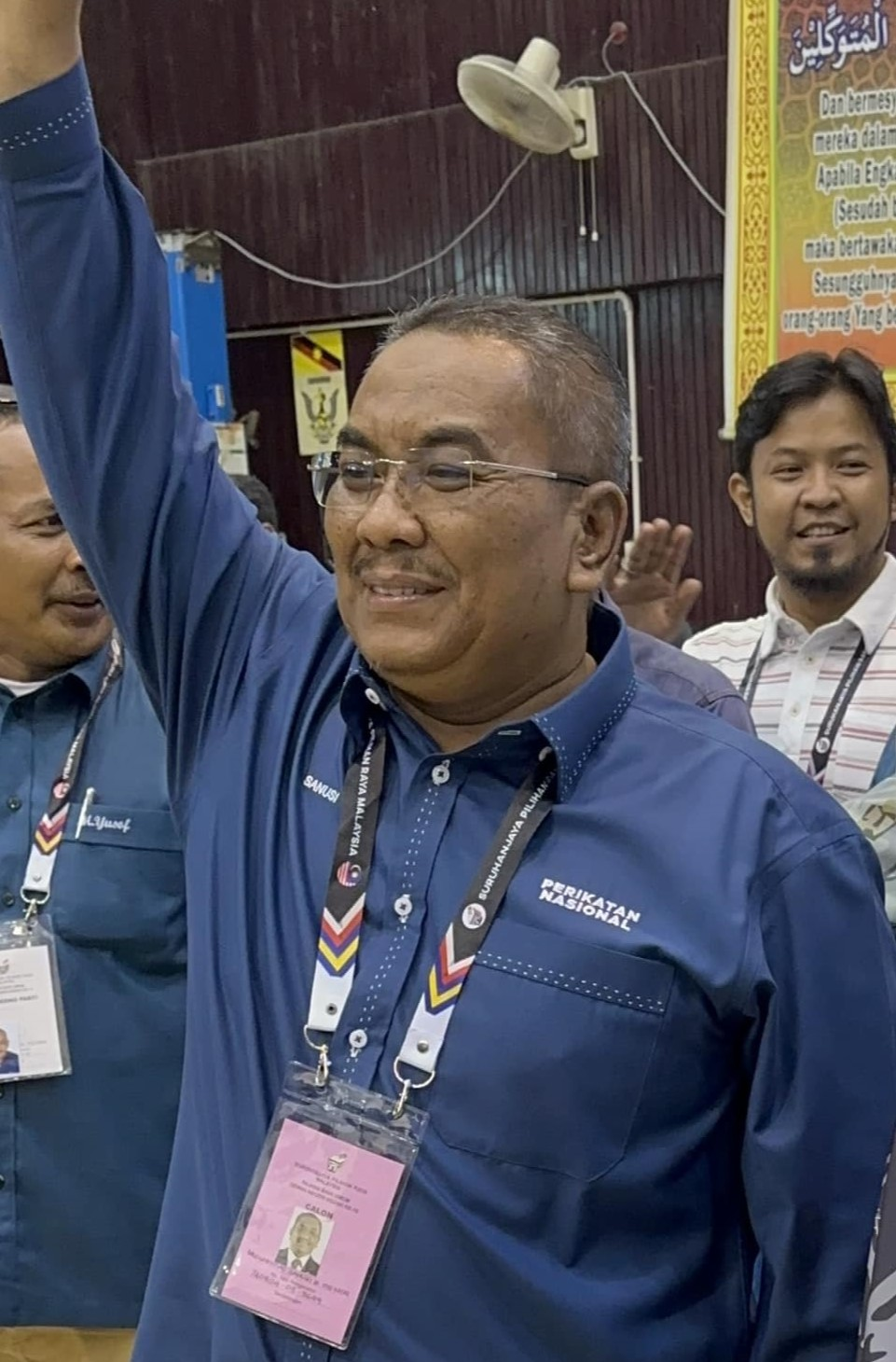
Muhammad Sanusi Md Nor, the 14th Menteri Besar of Kedah.

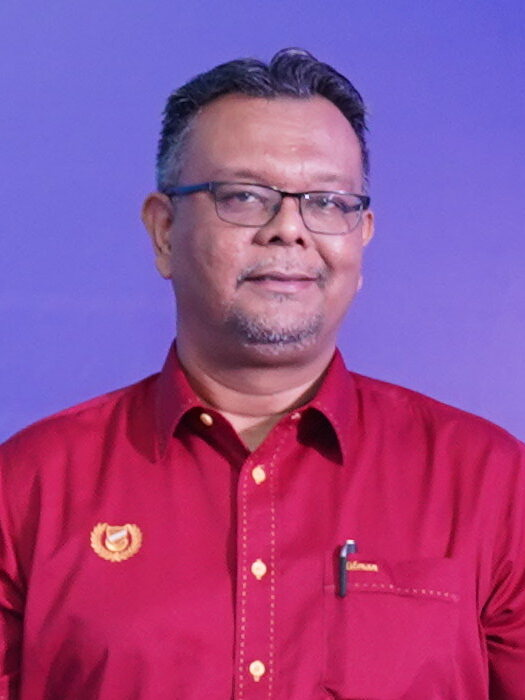
Haim Hilman Abdullah, the Member of the Kedah State Executive Council for Industry and Investment, Higher Education, Science, Technology and Innovation, who spearhead Kedah state government for investment purposes and right-hand man of Muhammad Sanusi for the Greater Kedah vision.

The concept of Greater Kedah 2050 refers to a broader region that encompasses not only the state of Kedah but also its surrounding areas, including Langkawi, Kulim, Sungai Petani, Alor Setar and other districts/cities. The goal is to integrate these areas into a cohesive and strategically planned economic zone that can drive the future growth of the state. The Greater Kedah also will only use domestic resources to push the state to a better level. Muhammad Sanusi said that it is different when compared to Greater Kuala Lumpur or Greater Penang which have been implemented for a long time.

== Background ==
In essence, the "Greater Kedah" would typically refer to the urbanized and developed areas within Kedah, as well as nearby regions with economic or infrastructural ties to the state. This could also be used in terms of urban planning or regional development to describe areas that are growing and forming a larger interconnected economic region.

Key components of the early Greater Kedah could include:

- Kuala Kedah: A town near the state capital, Alor Setar, and an important port.
- Alor Setar: The capital and largest city of Kedah, known for its historical sites and economic significance.
- Kulim: A growing industrial and urban area located in the southern part of Kedah, which is connected to the nearby state of Penang.
- Sungai Petani: A significant town in the south of Kedah, known for its economic activity and growing population.
- Langkawi: An archipelago and a popular tourist destination that falls under the administration of Kedah.

== Policies ==
The Greater Kedah: Empowering Lives initiative is a key part of the vision put forth by Muhammad Sanusi Md Nor, the Menteri Besar of Kedah. This initiative, officially launched in 2021, and relaunched in 2024, is designed to transform Kedah into a more developed and sustainable state by focusing on economic empowerment, inclusive development, and community well-being. It aligns with the broader Greater Kedah 2050 vision, which envisions the region's growth and transformation over the next few decades.

In 2022, the Kedah state government introduced the "Kedah Development Plan 2035".

In 2024, Kedah introduced the Greater Kedah Blueprint 2050.

In 2026, Sanusi envisioned the shift of Kedah industries from just producing products for the nation to creating solutions for the world. Therefore, the government started the "Kedah Young Professionals" programme with an emphasis on STEM education.

== The Greater Kedah from Muhammad Sanusi's vision ==
The concept of Greater Kedah from the vision of Muhammad Sanusi Md Nor are closely linked due to his role in shaping the state's development.

=== Northern Kedah ===
==== Kubang Pasu District ====
Kubang Pasu is an important district located near the Thai border and has a mix of agricultural and industrial activities.

- Key Features:
  - Cross-Border Trade: Strengthening trade with neighbouring Thailand through improved border facilities and transportation links.
  - Industrial Expansion: Promoting industrial development, particularly in electronics and agriculture-based industries.
  - Eco-Tourism: Leveraging the district's natural landscapes, including waterfalls and forests, to develop nature-based tourism and local community ventures.

=== Northeastern Kedah ===
==== Sik District ====
Sik is a predominantly rural district in Kedah, located in the northeastern part of the state. It is known for its natural landscapes, including forests, mountains, and waterfalls.

- Key Features:
  - Precision Farming: Similar to Bandar Baharu, Sik will see the introduction of Agri-Tech solutions for rubber, palm oil, and rice farming. This includes using smart sensors, drones, and data analytics to optimize crop yields and reduce waste.
  - Nature Tourism: Sik's natural beauty, such as mountains, caves, forests, and waterfalls, positions it as a potential hub for eco-tourism. The district could develop eco-friendly resorts, nature trails, camping sites, and wildlife sanctuaries to attract nature lovers and adventure tourists.
  - Agro-based Industries: Sik's potential for agro-based industries, such as rubber processing, palm oil refining, and fruit processing, could be leveraged by developing small-scale industrial parks.

=== Northwestern Kedah ===
==== Langkawi District ====
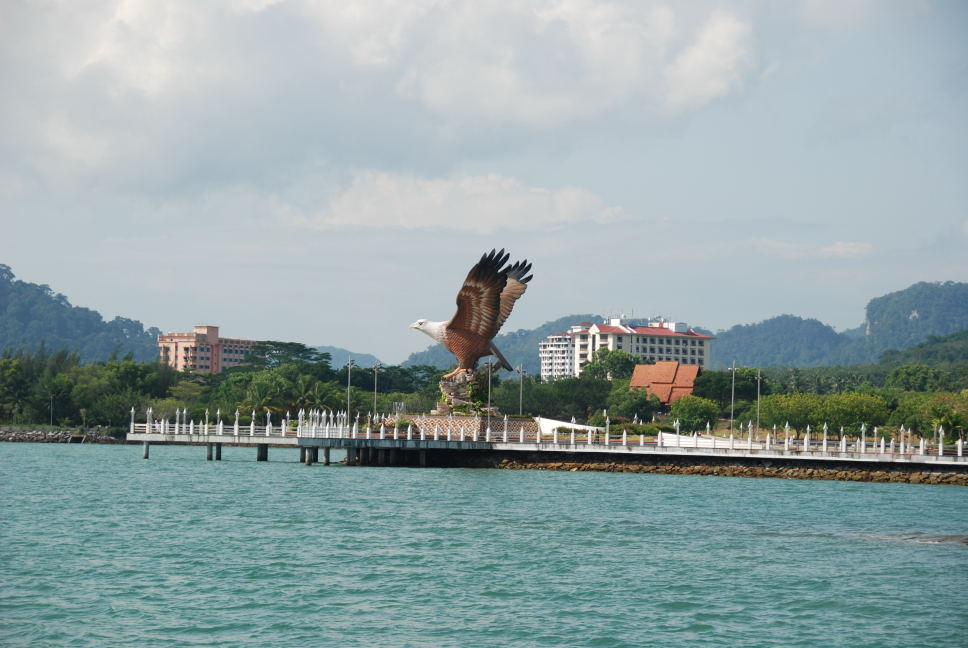
Kuah, seat of Langkawi District

Langkawi is an archipelago located in the Andaman Sea and is part of the state of Kedah. Known for its tourism industry, Langkawi is one of Malaysia's most popular tourist destinations.

- Key Features:
  - Tourism Hub: Langkawi's economy is primarily driven by tourism, with attractions like beaches, rainforests, and resorts.
  - International Accessibility: Langkawi has an international airport, making it easily accessible to tourists from around the world.
  - Natural Beauty: The district is known for its ecological diversity, including mangrove swamps, waterfalls, and wildlife.

=== Central Kedah ===
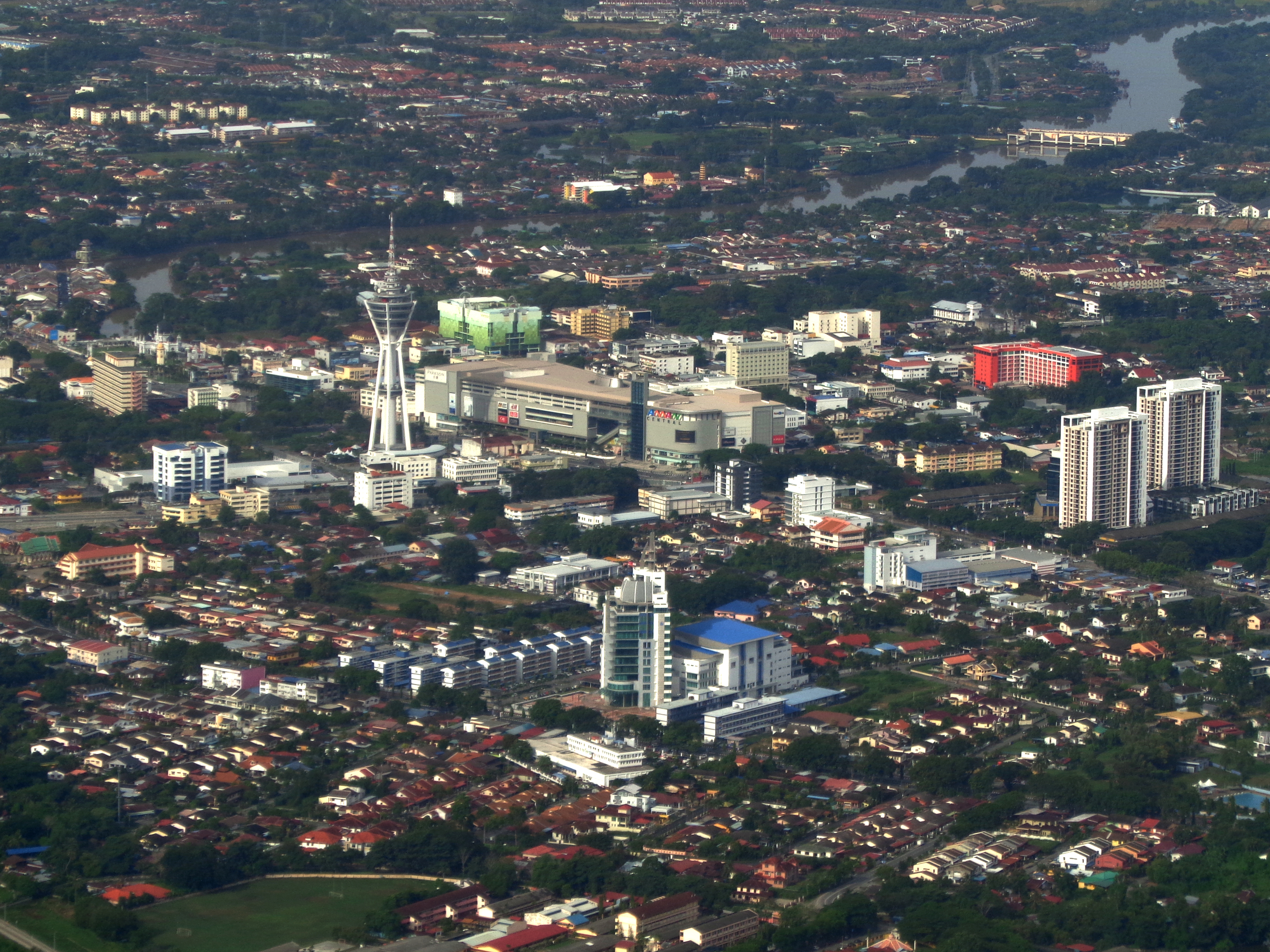
Alor Setar

==== Kota Setar District ====
Kota Setar's biggest city, Alor Setar is the state capital of Kedah and serves as the central hub of the state's economy, culture, and politics. It is one of the largest and most important cities in northern Malaysia.

- Key Features:
  - Economic Hub: Commercial, retail, and service industries are concentrated here.
  - Transport Hub: Alor Setar is a key transportation center with good road links to the rest of Kedah and nearby states.
  - Cultural Significance: Alor Setar is home to several historical landmarks, such as the Zahir Mosque, Alor Setar Tower, and Kedah State Art Gallery.
  - Agriculture: While urbanized, much of the district's economy is still driven by agriculture, particularly rice cultivation.
  - Urban Expansion: The expansion of Alor Setar and surrounding areas has led to the growth of residential and commercial developments.

==== Padang Terap District ====
Padang Terap is a more rural district but is still considered part of Greater Kedah due to its proximity to Alor Setar and role in agriculture.

- Key Features:
  - Agriculture: The district is primarily agricultural, with significant rice cultivation.
  - Rural Development: Rural infrastructure development is ongoing as the state aims to integrate rural areas with the broader economic development of Greater Kedah.

==== Pendang District ====
Pendang is a district located south of Alor Setar and serves as an agricultural area that contributes to the broader Kedah economy.

- Key Features:
  - Agriculture: Like other districts in Kedah, Pendang is heavily involved in agriculture, particularly rice production.
  - Transport Linkages: Pendang benefits from its location along major roads connecting it to Alor Setar and the southern regions of Kedah.

=== Southern Kedah ===
Downtown Sungai Petani

==== Kuala Muda District ====
Kuala Muda's biggest city, Sungai Petani is Kedah's largest urban area and an important commercial and industrial centre. Located south of Alor Setar and a few kilometres away from the state border with Penang, it plays a significant role in the state's economy.

- Key Features:
  - Industrial Development: Known for its growing industries, particularly in manufacturing, logistics, and retail.
  - Infrastructure: The city is well-connected by major highways, including the North–South Expressway (PLUS), making it easy to travel to Penang and other northern states.
  - Residential Growth: Sungai Petani has witnessed rapid population growth, with suburban developments around the city.

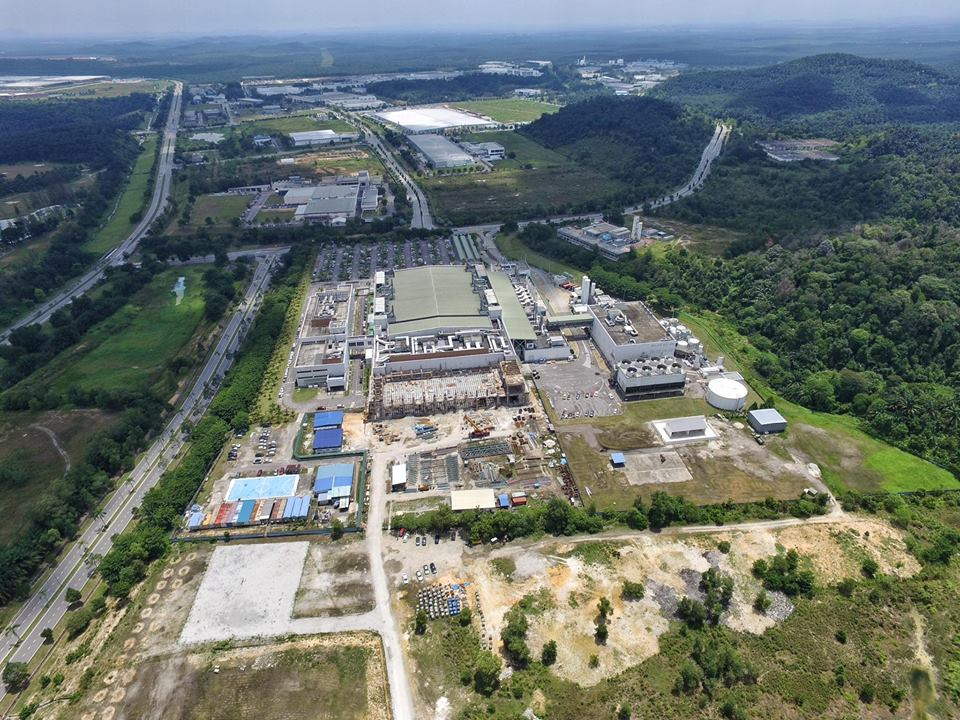
Kulim Hi-Tech Park

==== Kulim District ====
Kulim is an important district in southern Kedah, adjacent with Penang. It is rapidly industrializing and has seen significant growth in recent years.

- Key Features:
  - Kulim Hi-Tech Park: One of the major high-tech industrial parks in Malaysia, attracting foreign investment and driving technological growth.
  - Proximity to Penang: Kulim's proximity to Penang makes it part of a larger economic corridor, where industries in Kulim are often closely tied to Penang's economy.
  - Economic Focus: Focus on high-tech industries, electronics, manufacturing, and services.

==== Bandar Baharu District ====
Bandar Baharu is a growing district located in the southernmost part of Kedah, sandwiched between Penang and Perak. It has seen gradual development but is still largely rural, with agriculture being the primary economic activity.

- Key Features:
  - Agri-Tourism: With its rural landscapes, Bandar Baharu has the potential to develop agri-tourism by opening up farms and agricultural sites to tourists, providing educational experiences about sustainable farming practices.
  - Logistics and Warehousing: Given its location near major highways, Bandar Baharu is well-suited to become a logistics and warehousing hub, supporting regional distribution networks.

=== Southeastern Kedah ===
==== Baling District ====
Baling is a district in the southeast of Kedah, which is part of the Greater Kedah region. While it is more rural, it has economic ties to the surrounding areas.

- Key Features:
  - Natural Resources: The district has vast agricultural land and is known for rubber, palm oil, and rice farming.
  - Proximity to Thailand: Baling is near the Thai border, which allows for cross-border trade and cultural exchange, impacting its local economy.

=== Southwestern Kedah ===
==== Yan District ====
Yan is located in the southwestern part of Kedah and is part of the Greater Kedah region.

- Key Features:
  - Agricultural Economy: Much of the district's economy is based on agriculture, with a focus on palm oil, rice, and other crops.
  - Tourism Potential: Yan is home to scenic landscapes, including waterfalls, beaches, and forests, which could have untapped tourism potential.

== Megaproject related ==
=== Kulim Hi-Tech Park expansion ===
The Kulim Hi-Tech Park (KHTP) is one of the most significant megaprojects under the Greater Kedah 2050 plan. Located in Kulim, this park is a key player in Kedah's vision to become a hub for high technology industries such as electronics, biotechnology, clean energy, and precision engineering. The expansion of KHTP aims to attract more foreign direct investment and increase the state's technological capabilities. It will create thousands of job opportunities in high-tech fields, enhance R&D (research and development), and contribute significantly to Kedah's gross domestic product. The park focuses on industries such as semiconductors, electronics manufacturing, solar energy, and medical technology.

=== Northern Corridor Economic Region (NCER) ===
The Northern Corridor Economic Region (NCER) is an initiative to develop the northern states of Malaysia, including Kedah, Perlis, Penang, and Perak, into a robust economic zone. As part of the Greater Kedah 2050 plan, Kedah is positioned to benefit from this initiative, particularly through improved infrastructure, industrial parks, and logistical hubs. The project aims to stimulate regional development, improve interstate connectivity, and create economic growth through integrated infrastructure and enhanced trade between the northern states and the rest of Malaysia. NCER will focus on high-value sectors like manufacturing, agriculture, and tourism. The project will involve the construction of new highways, rail links, and logistics hubs to improve regional connectivity and business operations.

=== Langkawi development and eco-tourism projects ===
Langkawi, a UNESCO Global Geopark, is a central component of Kedah's tourism strategy. As part of Greater Kedah 2050, Langkawi will undergo significant development to enhance its status as a top-tier tourist destination, focusing on eco-tourism, luxury resorts, and sustainable tourism practices. The project aims to boost tourist arrivals, create job opportunities in hospitality and related industries, and maintain Langkawi's environmental sustainability. Infrastructure improvements, including better transportation and public amenities, will enhance visitor experiences. The development will include luxury hotel projects, marina developments, nature reserves, and eco-friendly resorts designed to blend with the island's natural beauty.

=== Development of the Sungai Petani and Alor Setar urban centres ===
Both Sungai Petani and Alor Setar are key cities in Kedah and will undergo significant urban renewal and development under the Greater Kedah 2050 vision. These cities are expected to become modern commercial and industrial hubs, with a focus on improving infrastructure, public services, and business opportunities. The aim is to transform these urban centers into economic powerhouses in the region, improving quality of life for residents, attracting investment, and creating a better business environment. This will involve modernizing transport networks, upgrading public housing, and expanding commercial zones. This project in an effort to upgrading of public transport systems, affordable housing projects, and new shopping complexes and business districts. Additionally, the expansion of the Alor Setar and Sungai Petani industrial zones will promote local and regional economic growth.

=== Kulim International Airport Development ===
The development of the Kulim International Airport (KXP) is another significant megaproject aligned with the Greater Kedah 2050 vision. The airport will serve as a key gateway to the state, boosting tourism, trade, and regional connectivity. The airport aims to serve both domestic and international flights, enhancing Kedah's logistical capabilities and facilitating the movement of goods and people. The project is intended to boost the local economy by promoting tourism, trade, and investment. The airport will be equipped with modern facilities and designed to accommodate the growing demand for air travel to Kedah and the surrounding region.

=== Kedah Integrated Industrial Park ===
The development of an Integrated Industrial Park in Kedah aims to consolidate various industrial zones and create a unified hub for manufacturing, logistics, and technology companies. The project seeks to foster economic growth by attracting both local and foreign investors into sectors such as high-tech manufacturing, renewable energy, and logistics. The park will include state-of-the-art infrastructure, business incubators, and facilities tailored to industries such as electronics, automotive, and pharmaceuticals.

=== Smart City Initiatives ===
Under the Greater Kedah 2050 vision, the state plans to develop smart cities in key urban areas, especially in Alor Setar and Sungai Petani, to improve urban living and enhance government services. These smart cities will integrate digital technologies to improve public services, transportation, energy usage, and waste management. The project aims to make Kedah's urban centers more efficient, sustainable, and livable. The development of IoT (Internet of Things) systems for managing traffic, smart grids for energy distribution, and digital services for residents and businesses.

== See also ==
- Northern Corridor Economic Region
- George Town Conurbation
- Iskandar Malaysia, in Johor
- Malaysia Vision Valley, in Negeri Sembilan
- Sabah Development Corridor, in Sabah
- Sarawak Corridor of Renewable Energy, in Sarawak
- Wawasan 2020
- Shared Prosperity Vision 2030
- Transformasi Nasional 2050
