= Sabah Development Corridor =

Economic corridor in Sabah, Malaysia

The logo of SDC.

The Sabah Development Corridor or SDC (Malay: Koridor Pembangunan Sabah or Koridor Sabah) is a new development corridor in Sabah, Malaysia. The SDC was launched on 29 January 2008 by the Malaysian fifth Prime Minister, Abdullah Ahmad Badawi.

The project is expected to take 18 years with total investment of up to RM 105 billion. On average, starts from the year of 2009, RM5.83 billion will be allocated each year for development. 900,000 jobs are expected to be created with this project along with a waterfront city, tourism sub project and a Sabah Railway terminal. The project kick-started with the Prime Minister Abdullah Ahmad Badawi announcing that the government has allocated an extra RM 5 billion under the Ninth Malaysia Plan to improve infrastructure and lower the cost of doing business in the state.

Key objectives of the project are:

- make Sabah a gateway for trade, investment and tourism
- transform the state into a harmonious state regardless of race or religion
- create job opportunities in the state
- make the state more technology-savvy
- make the state a comfortable state to live in

== See also ==
- East Coast Economic Region
- Iskandar Malaysia
- Malaysia Vision Valley
- Malaysian National Projects
- Ninth Malaysia Plan
- Northern Corridor Economic Region
  - The Greater Kedah 2050
- Sarawak Corridor of Renewable Energy
