= Sarawak Corridor of Renewable Energy =

Economic corridor in Sarawak, Malaysia

The logo of SCORE

The Sarawak Corridor of Renewable Energy (SCORE; Malay: Koridor Tenaga Diperbaharui Sarawak) is an economic region and development corridor covering central Sarawak, a Malaysian State on the island of Borneo. SCORE was launched in 2008. It is one of the five regional development corridors launched throughout Malaysia during the Abdullah Badawi administration. SCORE is managed by the Regional Corridors Development Authority ("RECODA"), a state government agency created through an Ordinance of the State Legislative Assembly.

== History ==
SCORE was launched on 11 February 2008 by the 5th Malaysian Prime Minister, Datuk Seri Abdullah Ahmad Badawi. SCORE was immediately placed under the jurisdiction of Regional Corridors Development Authority (RECODA) where the latter was created under an ordinance passed in the state assembly back in 2006. RECODA must consist of a chairman, two deputy chairmen, and between five and ten other board members. This agency promotes, manages, and oversees the implementation of development projects inside the corridor. SCORE covered an area of 70,000 km^{2} at the central region of Sarawak, with a coast line of 320 km long; encompassing urban centres such as Sibu, Bintulu, Mukah, Sarikei, Bintulu, Miri, Lawas, Limbang, and Kapit.

Initial plan for SCORE was to construct 12 hydroelectric dams with 7,800 MW of installed capacity, connected to industrial facilities located at the coast of Sarawak, targeting 50 dams with eventual installation capacity of 20,000 MW. Batang Ai Dam was commissioned on 21 August 1985, followed by Bakun Dam in 2014, and Murum Dam in 2015. In November 2015, chief minister Adenan Satem halted the Baram Dam project indefinitely due to persistent protests from the local communities. In 2017, Sarawak acquired Bakun Dam from the Malaysian federal government at a cost of RM 2.5 billion. Baleh Dam started construction in 2020 after completion of river diversions works. The dam is expected to commission in 2026.

Companies given the pioneer status, involving in high tech industries, heavy capital investments, or high research and development activities will enjoy 100% exemption on its statutory income for 5 years. Other incentives include Investment Tax Allowance (ITA) and Reinvestment Allowance (RA) in the manufacturing industry.

In 2021, SCORE became part of the "Post Covid-19 development strategy" where the latter was introduced in July 2021.

== Targets ==
The initial aim of setting up SCORE was to develop central region of Sarawak, improving the state's economic growth, thus achieving the national objective of Vision 2020 for becoming a developed state. The development corridor also targets 1.5 million jobs creation by the year 2030. By 2013, the state government has identified SCORE as one of the means to achieve high income and advanced economy by 2030. The economic corridor also planned to achieve RM 334 billion (US$110 billion) in total investments, where RM 67 billion (20%) are funded by the government (a mix of investments from government-linked companies, state, and federal funds) and the remaining RM 267 billion (80%) are funded by private sector. Other targets include: increase the size of the economy by a factor of five to RM 118 billion, increase per capita income to RM 97,400, increase the number of jobs by a factor of 2.5, and doubling the population to 4.6 million by the year of 2030.

It focus on ten priority industries in agriculture, mining, and manufacturing sectors such as aquaculture, livestock rearing, timber, palm oil, petroleum, aluminum, and steel and glass industries. Total investments into these industries are projected to reach RM 200 billion where oil-based industries amount to RM 60 billion, aluminium industry accounted for RM 23 billion, palm oil industry at RM 17 billion, and timber-based industry RM 11 billion.

== Agencies Under RECODA ==
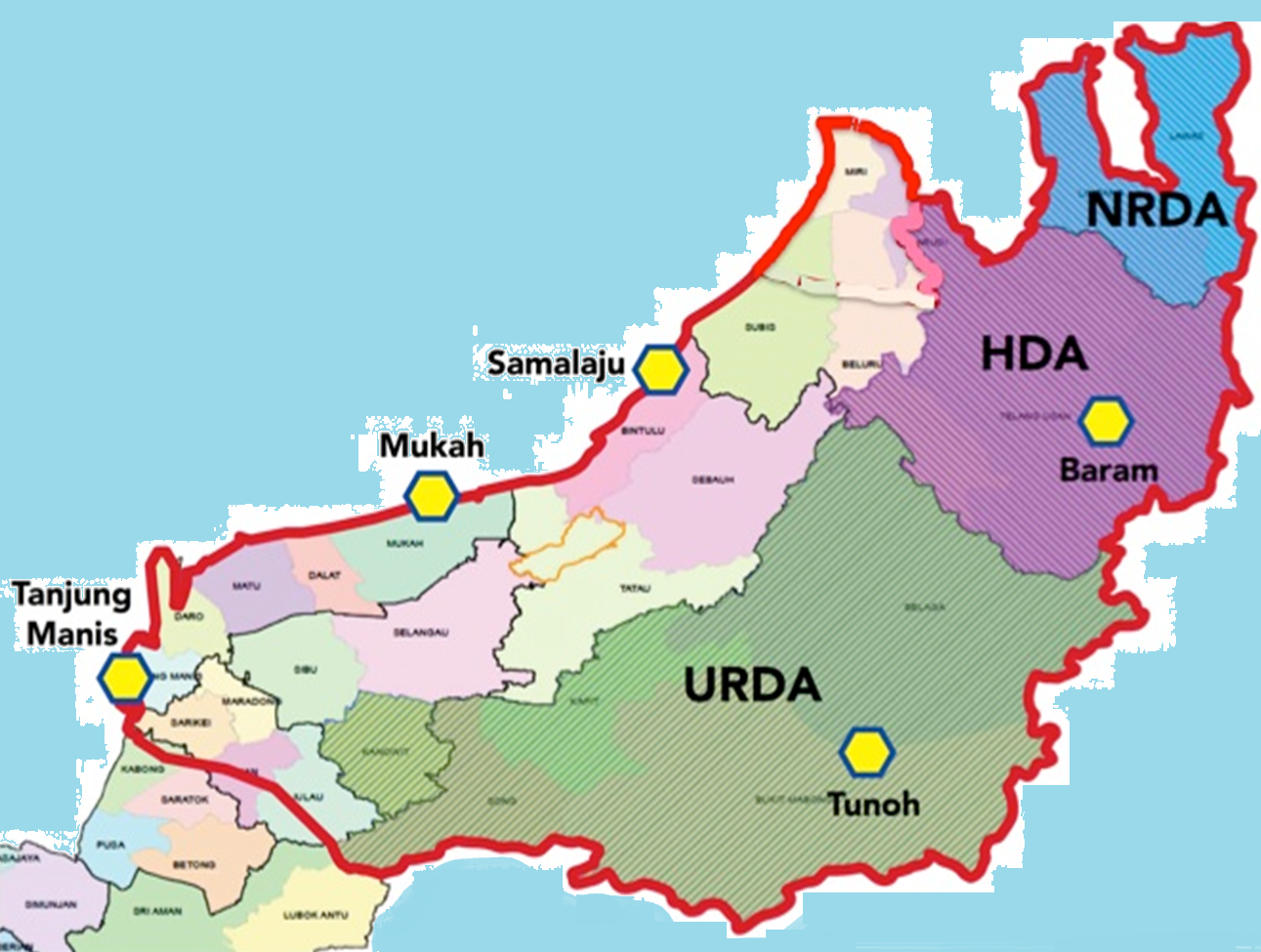
Source: RECODA

In order to expand the SCORE initiative into rural Sarawak, three agencies under RECODA were established. This initiative expanded the SCORE development area from initial 70,000 km^{2} to 100,000 km^{2}, which is about two-thirds of Sarawak area.

=== Upper Rajang Development Agency (URDA) ===
URDA was established on July 12, 2017. Its inaugural chairman was deputy chief minister James Jemut Masing. This agency covers areas involving Kapit, Kanowit, Song, Belaga, and Bukit Mabong, totalling 41,186 km^{2} in area. Major development projects for URDA are the construction and management of Bakun Dam, Murum Dam, and Baleh Dam and building access roads to the dams and between settlement areas.

As of December 2020, there were four projects under planning and 28 projects under implementation. One of such projects is the construction of 73 km road network from Kapit to Baleh Dam. This enables remote villages from around Baleh area road access to Kapit town.

=== Highland Development Agency (HDA) ===
HDA was established on July 12, 2017. This agency covers an area of 18,462 km^{2} involving 75,000 people across 244 villages and longhouses in Bario, Mulu, and Long Lama. Deputy chief minister Douglas Uggah Embas served as the inaugural chairman of the HDA. As of December 2020, 10 projects were under planning and 19 projects were under implementation under HDA. Among the projects implemented were Long Lama Rural Growth Centre and Integrated Highland Agriculture Station (IHAS). IHAS aims to become an agricultural products collection, chilling, and packaging facility for the Baram region. IHAS covers an area of 634 hectares including Long Beruang, Long Banga, and Long Peluan areas. Facilities included in IHAS are offices, an internet centre, a multipurpose hall, a production centre, schools, hostels, a training centre, and road networks connecting to surrounding farmlands. In September 2022, IHAS was transferred to a new ministry named Ministry of Modernisation of Agriculture and Regional Development Sarawak (MANRED).

=== Northern Region Development Agency (NRDA) ===
NRDA was established on March 15, 2018. Deputy chief minister Awang Tengah Ali Hassan was the inaugural NRDA Chairman. It encompasses Limbang and Lawas, covering an area of 7,790 km^{2}. NRDA is involved in roads constructions, building water supply, and a new airport in Lawas. As of December 2020, 12 projects were under planning and 64 projects were under implementation. One of such projects is Northern Coastal Highway that aims to connect Miri, Limbang, and Lawas to neighbouring state of Sabah through various custom checkpoints in Brunei, Limbang, and Lawas; by constructing a dual carriageway.

== Growth nodes ==
=== Samalaju ===
Samalaju Industrial Park began construction in 2009. In January 2011, Tokuyama's polycrystalline silicon factory was opened in the industrial park. As of 2012, investors committed RM 29 billion to Samalaju Industrial Park, created 17,333 new jobs. As of 2014, 15 out of 19 projects in SCORE are located in Samalaju, with total cumulative foreign direct investment (FDI) of MYR 27 billion. Companies such as Press Metal Bhd, OM Materials (Sarawak), Pertama Ferroalloys, Sakura Ferroalloys, OCI Malaysia (previously Tokuyama Malaysia), and Iwatani-SIG Industrial Gases Sdn Bhd, and Elkem Carbon Malaysia are operational in Samalaju since 2014. Other development projects near the industrial park are Samalaju Eco Park Township and Samalaju port. Residential properties, shoplots, transportation hub, and light industrial facilities are located inside the Eco Park Township. Samalaju port handled 4 million tonnes of cargo annually in 2015.

As of 2018, there was no data of socioeconomic impact on the local community, such as employment and wages, and involvement of local companies in the industrial park. In response to this, the 2019 RECODA annual report included details of private investments made by each company and number of jobs created.

=== Mukah ===
Mukah aims to become a smart city focusing in education and information technology. Amongst projects that were planned in 2013 were: new Mukah Airport, Universiti Teknologi MARA (UiTM) campus, and Mukah Science Park. Mukah Coal Fired power plant started operation in April 2009. This was followed by Press Metal Sarawak opening its first aluminium smelting plant in August 2009. In April 2011, Mukah new administrative centre was built that houses the head office of RECODA and Dalat & Mukah District Council. Since 2014, Matadeng Industrial park, located at 30 km from the Mukah town, was planned. New Mukah Airport started construction in 2017 and commenced operation in June 2021. Construction of new UiTM Mukah Campus started in 2012 and completed in 2015, capable of housing 2,000 students. Three faculties are based in this new campus, namely: faculty of business management, faculty of plantation and agrotechnology, and faculty of Applied Science. Mukah Rinwood 10 MW biomass power plant also started construction in 2015. It uses oil palm waste such as empty fruit branch, palm kernel shell, and mesocarp fibre to generate electricity.

Balingian coal fired power plant began construction in 2015. The power plant started operating in May 2019.

=== Tanjung Manis ===
Tanjung Manis aims to become a palm oil integrated centre and halal food hub. Tanjung Manis Halal Hub was launched in February 2009. Other projects planned includes building an integrated port and deep sea fishing port. In 2013, Sea Party International Co Ltd from Taiwan invested in this area, involving in tilapia, marine fish, and shrimp farming projects.

=== Baram ===
The Baram region encompasses Miri, Marudi, Telang Usan, and Beluru. It aims develop highland agriculture, livestock rearing, and ecotourism. Construction of IHAS started in 2015. Access roads to Baram Dam and Murum Dam were also planned.

=== Tunoh ===
Similar to Baram, Tunoh also aims to become an agriculture and eco-tourism centre. Access road to Baleh Dam was planned in 2013. Access road to Tunoh and a new township at Bukit Mabong was planned in 2016.

== Results ==
As of 2014, 19 projects with more than RM 32 billion in FDI has been approved cumulatively. Of these projects, 15 of them were located in Samalaju, and the remaining four were located in Tanjung Manis, Mukah and Kidurong. In the year 2014 alone, SCORE accounted for 90% of Sarawak's total foreign direct investment (FDI), amounting RM 9.6 billion, where 87.2% the investments were foreign. As of 2016, 16 projects in basic metal products industry, two projects in chemical industry, two projects under food manufacturing, and one project under petrochemical industry was approved. As of 2018, a total of nine projects were operational in the economic corridor, where seven of them were located in Samalaju, one each at Mukah and Tanjung Manis. SCORE recorded RM 79.97 billion in total investments, where RM 33.64 billion (42%) came from private investments. As of 2020, SCORE created 6,654 to 18,000 job opportunities. A total of 68% of the jobs were filled by locals. Export values worth RM 9.4 billion were generated in the same year. As of October 2021, cumulative private and public investments in SCORE stood at RM 71.1 billion, where public sector contributes 58.2% and foreign investments stood at 36.7%. In the year of 2022, total cumulative investments in SCORE stood at RM 102.36 billion where RM93.09 billion was contributed by the private sector and RM 9.17 billion contributed by public sector, where figures from 2021 annual report was quoted.

Sarawak failed to achieve a developed and industrialised state within Malaysia by the year 2020. RECODA stopped publishing annual reports after merging with "Post Covid-19 development strategy" in 2021. As of 2023, 84 out of 251 of the projects implemented by RECODA were completed.

Breakdown of recorded investments in RECODA annual reports
Year	Public	Investments (in RM billion)	Private	Investments (in RM billion)	Jobs	No
2012	Mukah (cumulative)	4.0	Samalaju (cumulative)	29.0	Samalaju (cumulative)	17,333
2012	Murum dam	3.0	Sea Party (Tanjung Manis)	1.9		
2012	Samalaju water supply	0.1	Mukah Press Metal	1.0		
2012	Samalaju Port	1.8				
2013	9th Malaysian Plan (2008-2010)	6.58	Sea Party (Tanjung Manis)	2.0	TERAJU	3,459
2013	10th Malaysian Plan (2011-2013)	4.0				
2014	9th Malaysian Plan (2008-2010)	6.6				
2014	10th Malaysian Plan (2011-2014)	3.8				
2015	9th Malaysian Plan (2008-2010)	6.6	Total	>30	Samalaju	6,500
2015	10th Malaysian Plan (2011-2015)	3.8			Construction	10,000
2016	Samalaju	1.4	Samalaju Growth Node	35.2	Samalaju	31,160
2016	Mukah	1.0	Mukah	1.8	Mukah	3,408
2016	Tanjung Manis	2.2	Tanjung Manis	2.2	Tanjung Manis	1,212
2016	Tunoh	0.43	Tunoh	0.002	Tunoh	4,229
2016	Baram	0.24	Baram	3.0	Baram	412
2016	Power generation and transmission excluding Bakun Dam	0.0	Power generation and transmission excluding Bakun Dam	17.1	Power generation and transmission excluding Bakun Dam	12,200
2016	Pan Borneo Highway (within SCORE area)	6.03	Pan Borneo Highway (within SCORE area)	0.0	Pan Borneo Highway (within SCORE area)	3,575
2017	Mukah (2009-2017)	0.45	Samalaju steel project	12.7	Samalaju	6,300
2017	Samalaju (2009-2017)	1.34	Samalaju methanol project	8.5		
2017	Tanjung Manis (2009-2017)	0.5				
2017	Tunoh (2009-2017)	1.54				
2017	Baram (2009-2017)	0.26				
2017	Access road to Murum HEP (2009-2017)	0.69				
2017	Sangan - Sg Anap Road (2009-2017)	0.23				
2018	11th Malaysian Plan (2016-2020)	3.9	Total	39.94	Total	17,828
2018	State projects	4.5				
2019	URDA	1.5	Samalaju	29.0	Samalaju	14,414
2019	HDA	1.5	Mukah	1.0	Mukah	900
2019	NRDA	1.5	Tanjung Manis	2.3	Tanjung Manis	1,852
2019			Tanjung Kidurong	8.2	Tanjung Kidurong	725
2020	URDA	1.5	Samalaju	42.0	Samalaju	23,424
2020	HDA	1.5	Mukah	1.0	Mukah	900
2020	NRDA	1.5	Tanjung Manis	2.3	Tanjung Manis	2,480
2020			Tanjung Kidurong	2.3	Tanjung Kidurong	1,888
2021	9th Malaysian Plan (2008-2010)	0.98	Samalaju (cumulative)	31.24	Samalaju	12,770
2021	10th Malaysian Plan (2011-2015)	1.6				
2021	11th Malaysian Plan (2016-2020)	1.8				
2021	12th Malaysian Plan (2021-2025)	0.12				
2021	NRDA	1.5				
2021	HDA	1.5				
2021	URDA	1.5				
2021	Talent and Community Development	0.024				

Total recorded investments in RECODA annual reports
Year	Public (in RM billion)	Private (in RM billion)	Total (in RM billion)	No. of Jobs
2012	9.2	31.9	41.1	17,333
2013	10.58	2.0	12.58	3,459
2014	10.38	—	—	—
2015	10.38	30.0	40.38	16,500
2016	11.3	59.4	70.76	56,196
2017	5.02	21.2	26.22	6,300
2018	46.4	33.6	80	17,093
2019	4.5	40.5	45	17,891
2020	4.5	60.45	64.95	27,851
2021	9.17	93.09	102.3	12,770

== Analysis ==
According to a report published in 2011, although SCORE helps to diversify Sarawak energy sources away from fossil fuels, it met several technical challenges such as a lack of proper highways to carry raw materials into rural areas, lack of proper electricity networks to carry power to consumers, difficulties in river diversion, tunneling, channeling, transportation of machines and turbines to the dam construction sites, and lack of highly trained engineers and construction workers to build the spillways, powerhouses, transformers, turbines, and dam face. The turbid river waters are filled with silt, sediments, logs, and rocks due to logging, erosions, and unsustainable agricultural practices. Such low quality river waters can make dam projects more complicated and shorten the lifetime of the dam usage to 30 to 40 years. These problems could make the electricity generated from SCORE unaffordable because of cost overruns and delays in financing the projects. An example is the cost overruns of Bakun Dam six times higher than the original price of RM 2.5 billion due to delays, rising interest rates, strikes and problems with excavations. Initially, construction companies have to underestimate their risks in order to have an edge in the tender bidding process. When problems emerged during constructions, additional payment have to be made in order to keep the project afloat, thus making the electricity generated by dams in Sarawak to be two to three times higher than expected. Building dams in the middle of the forests can be construed as high risk project as it deals with many problems such as logistical issues, indigenous communities and their lands, contractors and corruptions. The caused the investors to be risk averse, thus leading to delay in financing. The electrical energy generated from the dams are mainly for industry players, instead for local population. One respondent from the interview predicted that "the amount of jobs created for the local population is practically zero". Besides, the policy of SCORE to attract "energy inefficient" metal smelters is a waste of electricity. The construction of dams also causes environmental damage due to logging, changes in water biochemical profile, emission of methane gas from rotten vegetation, and submersion of tropical rainforests.

A study done in March 2015 at University of California showed that distributed energy plants such as solar and biomass can meet the future energy demand of the state when compared to dam construction. A study conducted by Universiti Malaysia Sabah concluded that there is a potential for agricultural development in SCORE because of the Sarawak government and Development Bank of Sarawak (DBOS) commitments to developing this industry. However, encouraging youths to participate in this industry would be a major challenge.

== See also ==
- East Coast Economic Corridor
- Iskandar Malaysia
- Malaysia Vision Valley
- Malaysian National Projects
- Ninth Malaysia Plan
- Northern Corridor Economic Region
  - The Greater Kedah 2050
- Sabah Development Corridor
