= Ninth Malaysia Plan =

The Ninth Malaysian Plan (Malay: Rancangan Malaysia ke-9), abbreviated as '9MP', is a comprehensive blueprint prepared by the Economic Planning Unit (EPU) of the Prime Minister's Department and the Finance Ministry of Malaysia with approval by the Cabinet of Malaysia. The plan allocates the national budget from 2006 to 2010 in regard to all economic sectors in Malaysia.

The blueprint was announced on 31 March 2006, and was unveiled by then Prime Minister Abdullah Ahmad Badawi in Parliament.

The economic development plan was unveiled at a time when Malaysia was starting to recover from the Asian financial crisis and challenging economic conditions as a result of high oil prices. The US-led Iraq invasion in 2003 resulted in a rise in oil prices to about US$60/barrel by August 2005, which was a few months before the plan was unveiled. These two factors were mentioned in Prime Minister's speech when tabling the Ninth Malaysia Plan on 31 March 2008 besides SARS, bird flu, and the 2004 Boxing Day earthquake and tsunami.

== Overview ==
The plan envisages Malaysia's GDP to grow (in real terms) by 6.0% per annum over the 2006 to 2010 period, and highlights five ways for Malaysia to move forward economically. These thrusts are:

1. To move the economy up the value chain
2. To raise the capacity for knowledge and innovation and to nurture a 'first class mentality'
3. To address socio-economic inequalities constructively and productively
4. To improve the standard and sustainability of quality life
5. To strengthen institutional and implementation capacity

== Highlight issues of 9MP ==
=== Infrastructure ===
- RM1500 bil savings from privatisation
- RM101111 bil for Iskandar Region Development Authority (IRDA)
- RM3.58 bil for building and upgrading rural roads
- RM29 bil for biotechnology (physical and soft infrastructures)
- RM11 bil for upgrading and extension of KKIA, second low cost hub for Malaysia
- Additional runway and satellite building for KLIA
- Double tracking at selected priority stretches
- An upgraded works of Pasir Gudang Highway and the construction of Johor Bahru Eastern Dispersal Link

=== Health ===
- RM10.28 bil for disease prevention
- RM2.3 bil for setting up National Institute of Cancer, National Forensic Institute and National Institute for Oral Health
- Eight new hospitals to be built...

=== Environment ===
- RM510 mil for cleaning, preserving and beautifying rivers
- RM4 bil for flood mitigation projects

=== Agriculture ===
- RM4.4 bil for modernising agriculture farming
- RM2.6 bil for support services
- RM1.5 bil for agricultural irrigation programmes
- Revitalising cocoa industry
- RM1 bil for growing more trees

=== Education ===
- RM 690 mil for teachers' accommodation or housing quarters
- RM 143 mil quarters in remote areas of Sabah & Sarawak
- Universities for the states of Terengganu and Kelantan
- 180 primary, 229 secondary and full boarding schools to be built

=== Culture, arts and heritage ===
- RM11.62 mil less for culture

== Mid Term Review ==
Mid-term review was tabled in Parliament on 26 June 2008. An additional MYR30 billion has been allocated to the plan, making the total allocation MYR230 billion. The extra MYR30 billion spending will be spent on:-

- RM 10 billion for corridor initiatives
- RM 2 billion for Sabah and Sarawak development
- RM 3 billion for food security
- RM 3 billion for Strategic Investment Fund
- RM 2 billion for double tracking rail projects between Ipoh and Padang Besar and Seremban and Gemas
- RM 2 billion for additional rural infrastructure
- RM 1.6 billion for public transportation
- RM 1 billion for low-cost and medium-cost housing
- RM 500 million for high impact education fund.
