= Northern Corridor Economic Region =

Special economic zone encompassing northwestern Peninsular Malaysia

Northern Corridor Economic Region Wilayah Ekonomi Koridor Utara
- Special economic zone
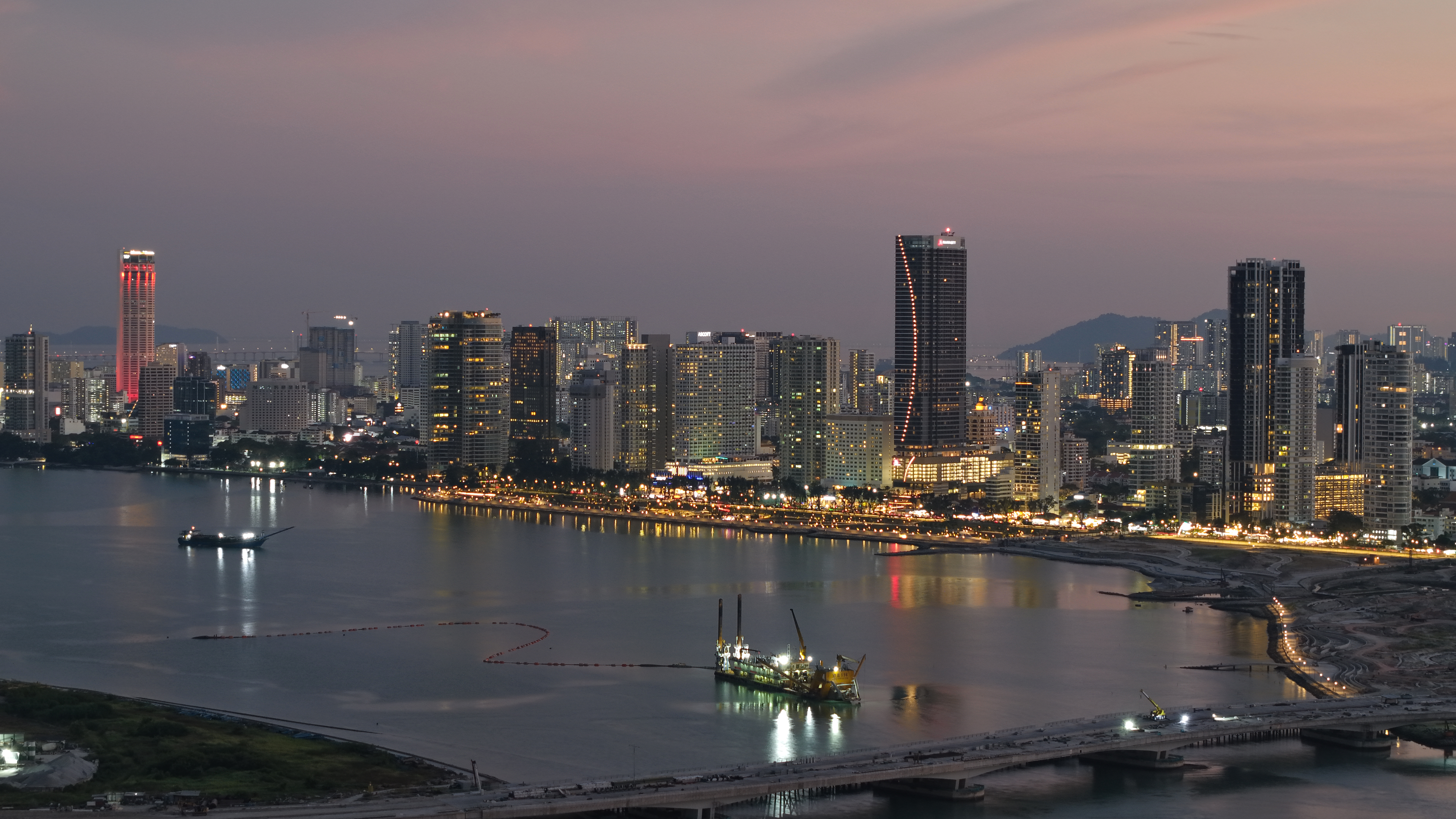
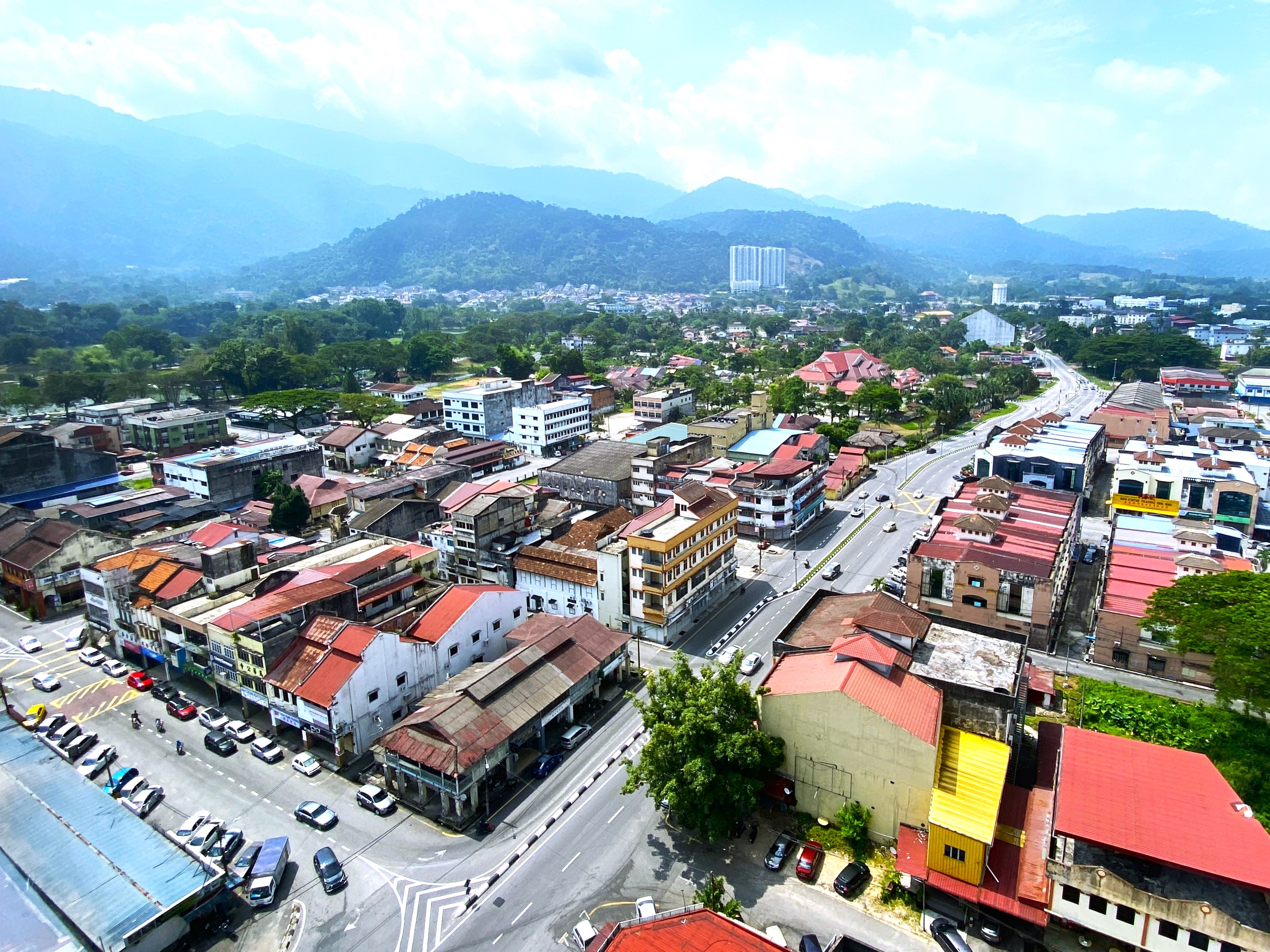
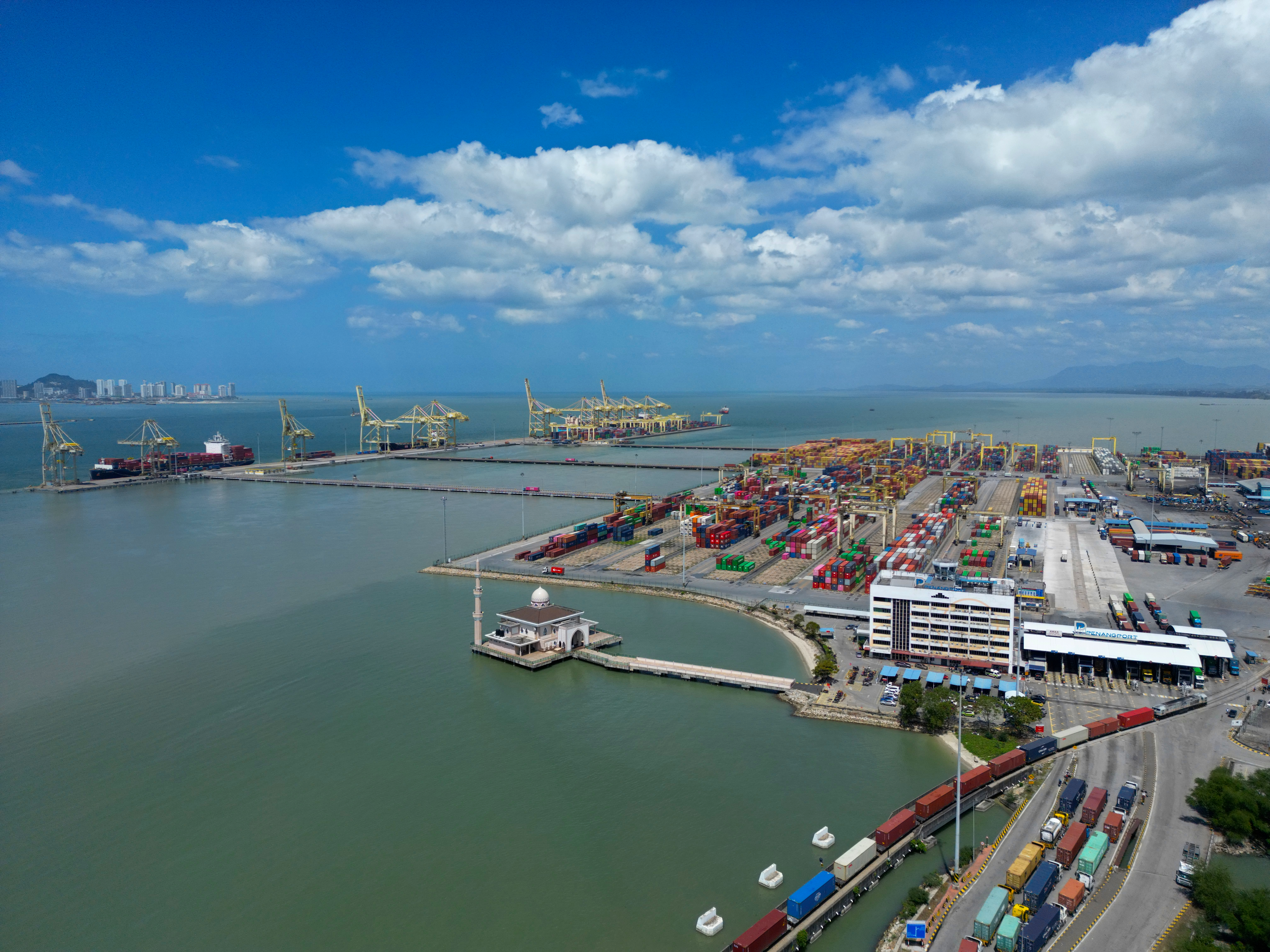
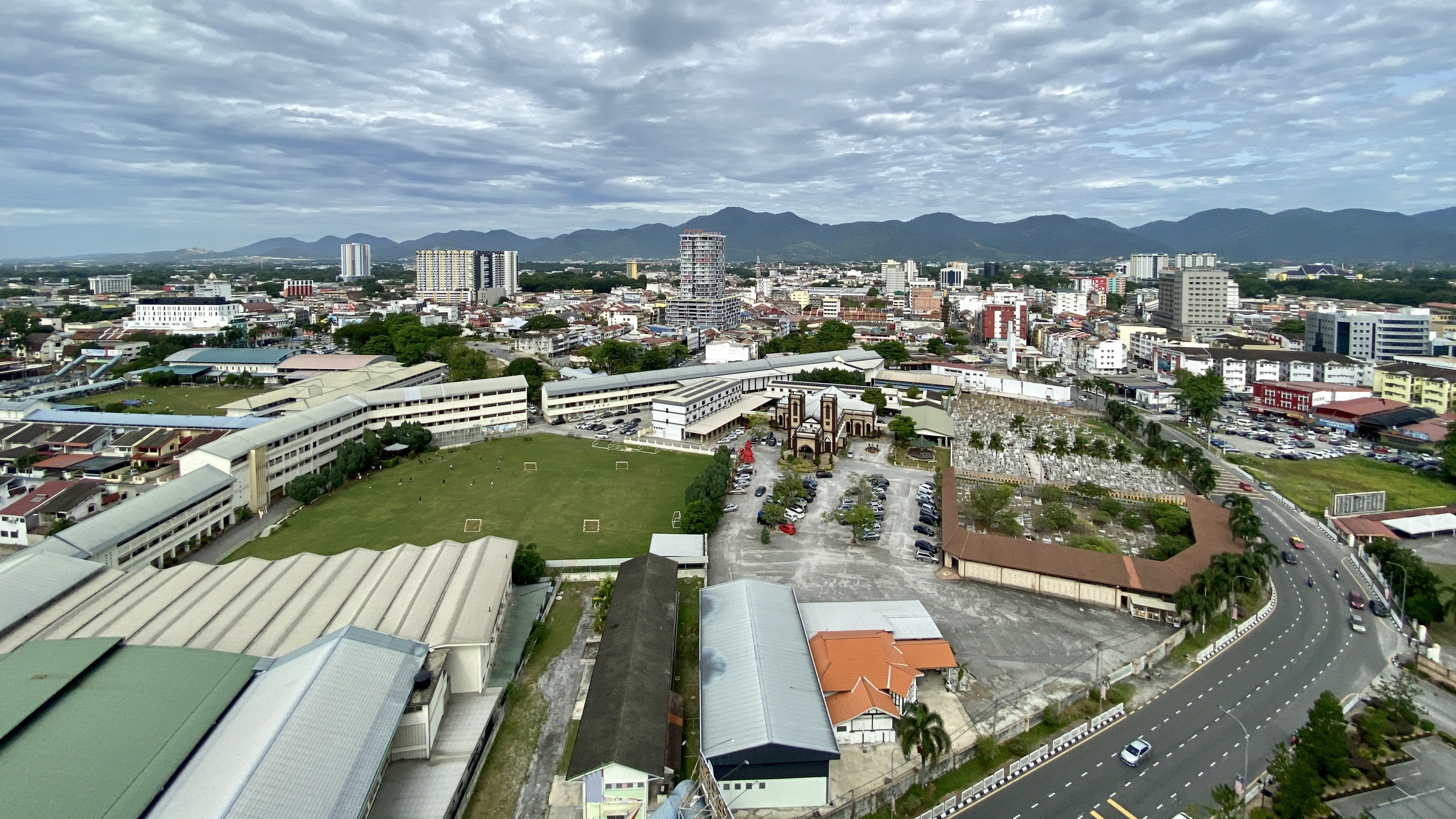
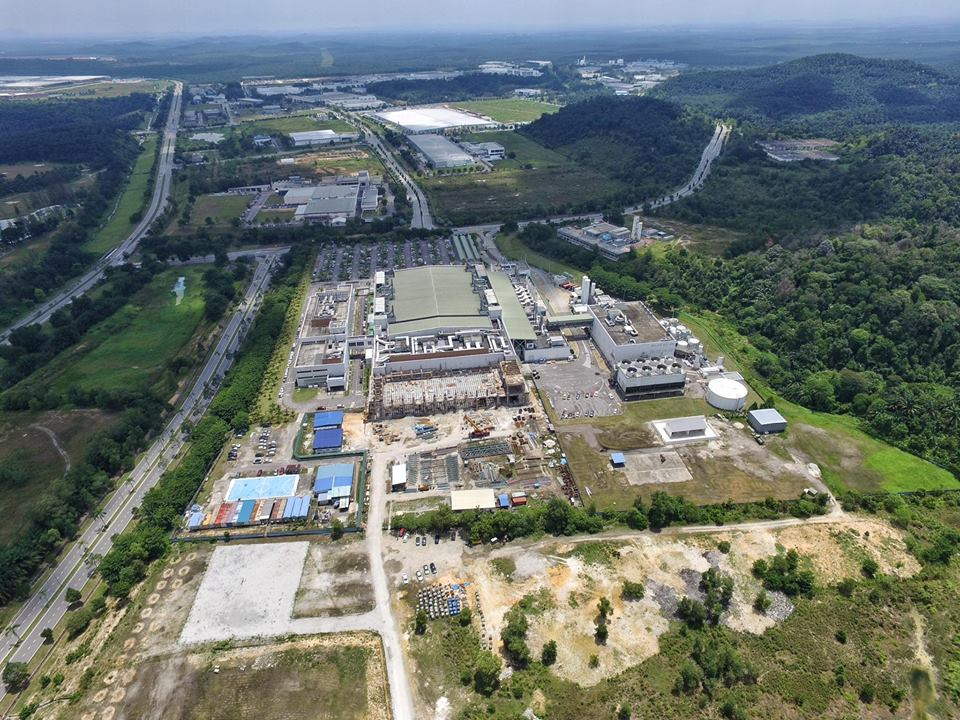
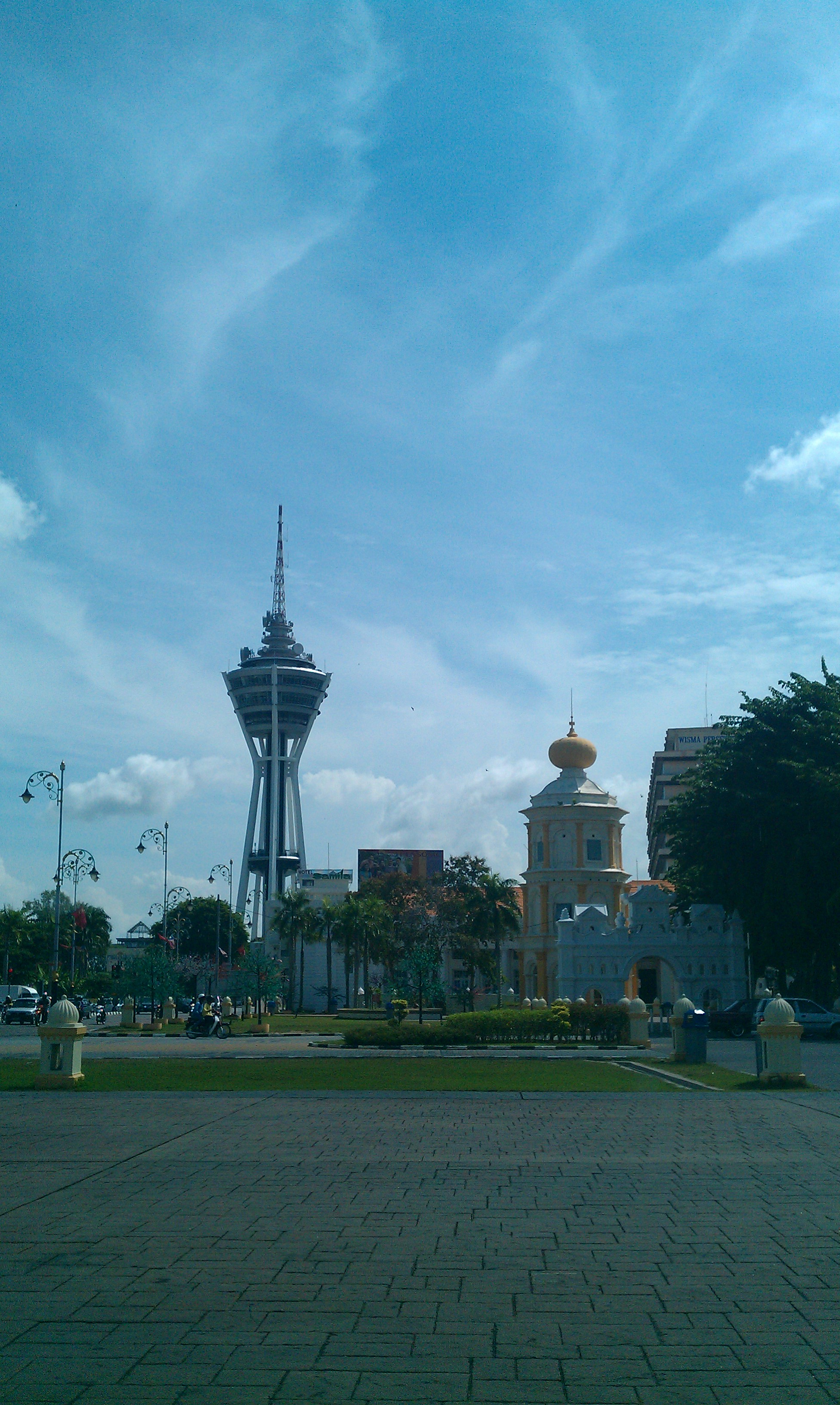
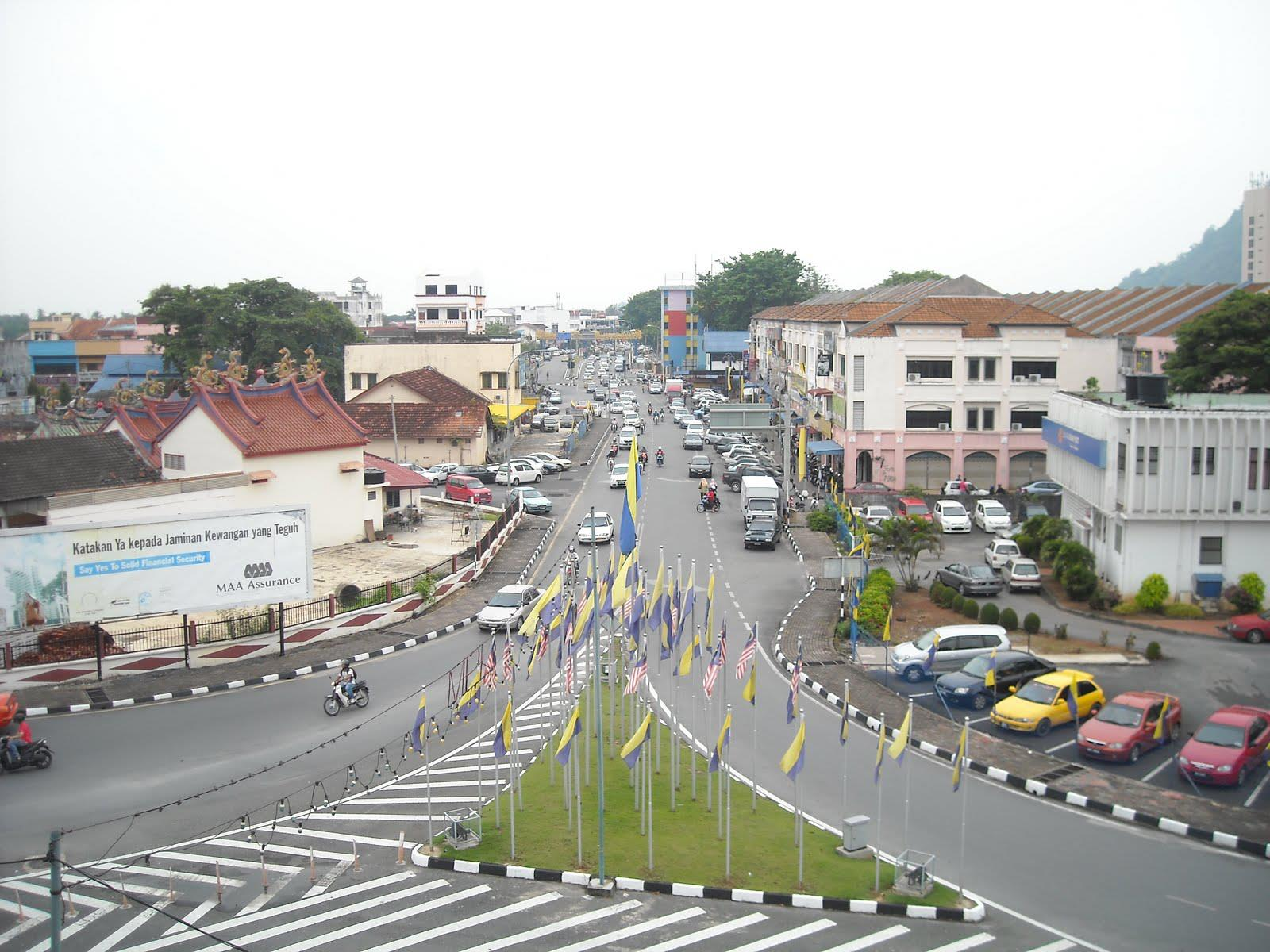
- From top, left to right: George Town, Taiping, Port of Penang, Ipoh, Kulim Hi-Tech Park, Sungai Petani, Alor Setar and Kangar

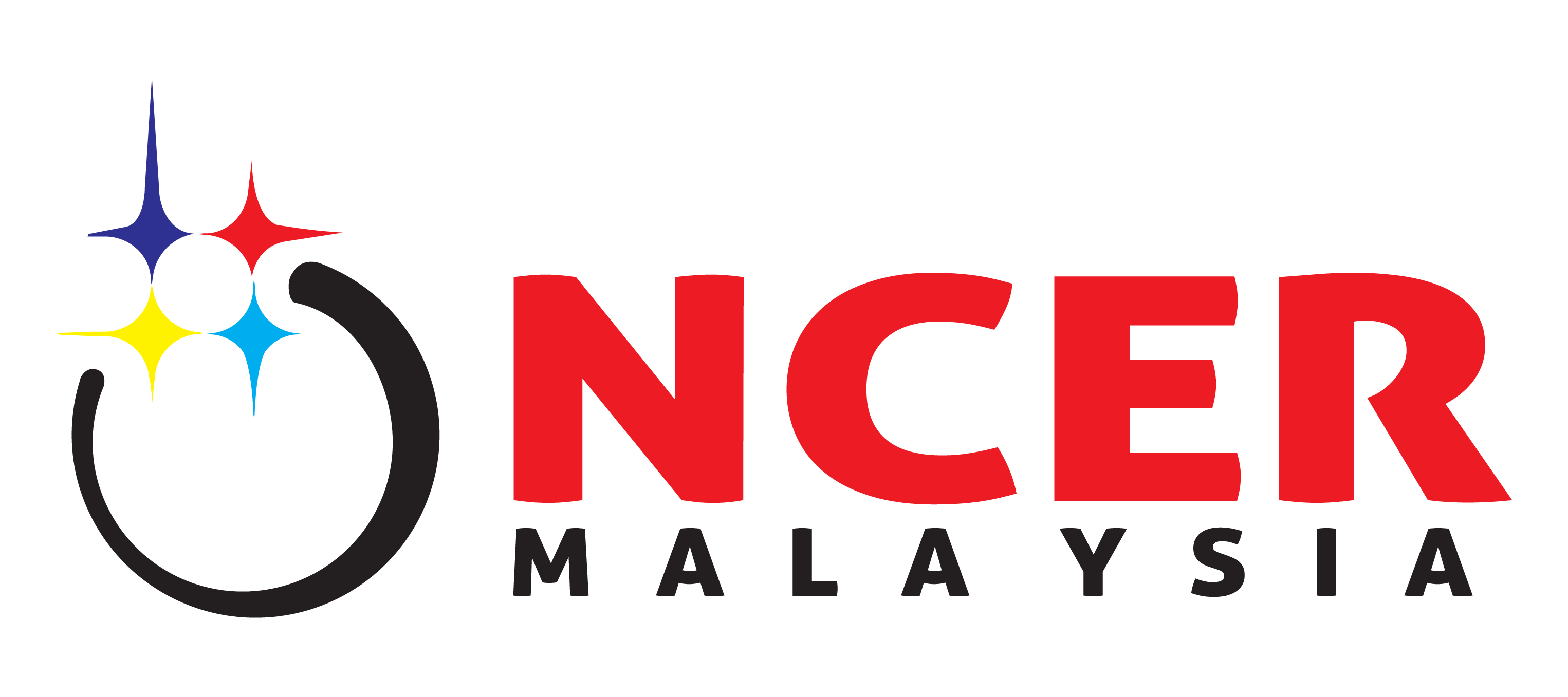
- Logo

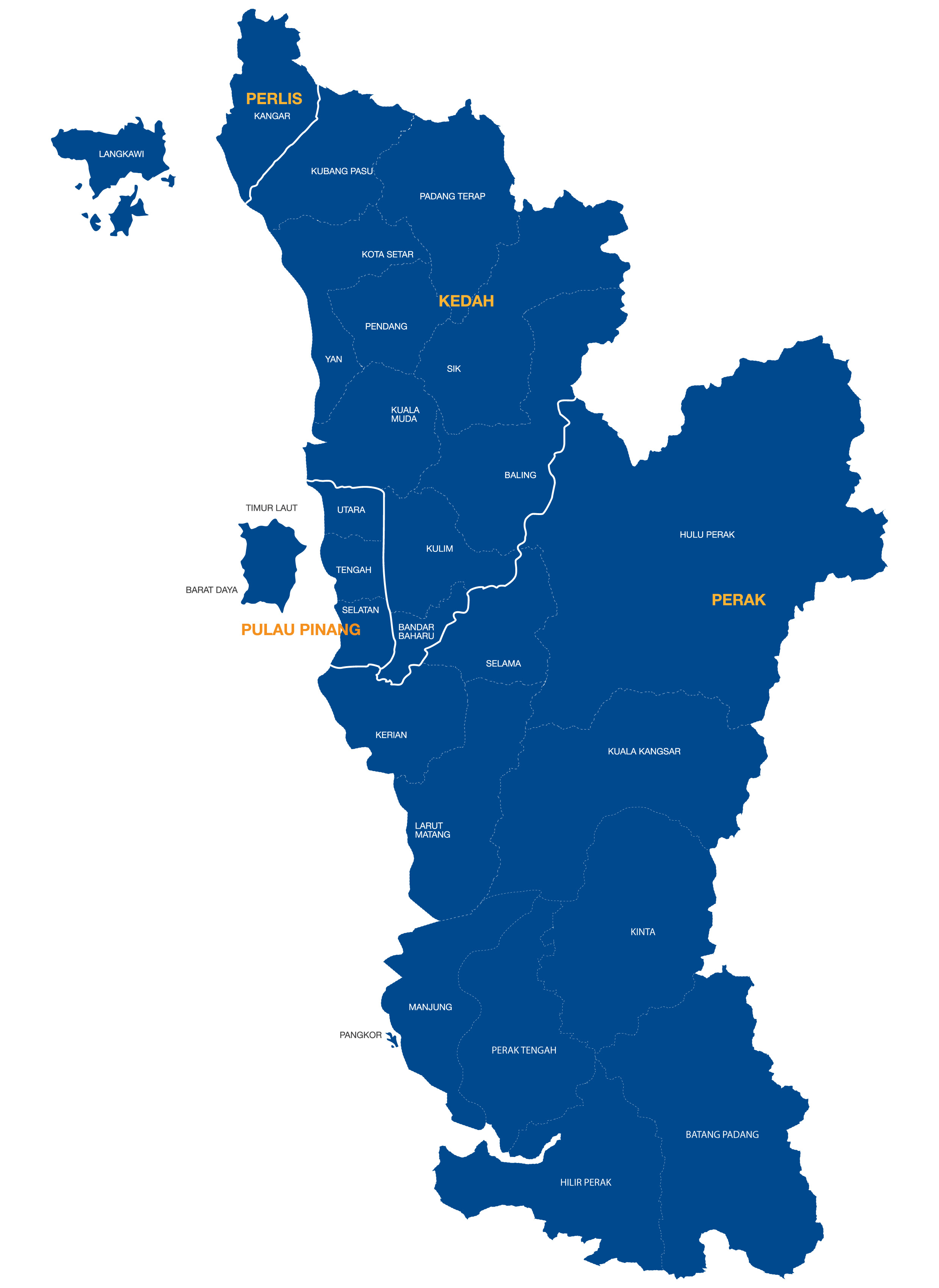
- NCER encompassing the states of Kedah, Pulau Pinang, Perak and Perlis.
- Country: Malaysia
- States: Kedah, Pulau Pinang, Perak, Perlis
- Created: 30 July 2007

Government
  - Statutory body: Northern Corridor Implementation Authority (NCIA)
  - Chairman: Anwar Ibrahim
  - Chief Executive Officer: Mohamad Haris Kader Sultan
  - Chief Operating Officer: Hasri A. Hassan

Area
  - Total: 32,343 km^{2} (12,488 sq mi)
- Website: www.ncer.com.my

The Northern Corridor Economic Region (abbrev. NCER), commonly referred to as the Northern Corridor, is a development plan encompassing the four northwestern states of Malaysia, namely Perlis, Penang, Kedah and Perak. It was launched in 2007 by the federal government with an aim to transform the region into a sustainable and socio-economically balanced region by 2025. The Northern Corridor Implementation Authority (NCIA) is the statutory body responsible to establishing the NCER's direction, policies and strategies.

== Background and history ==
In an effort to reduce regional imbalances and provide equitable economic growth across the country, the Government of Malaysia established five economic regions in the Ninth Malaysia Plan. The Northern Corridor Economic Region (NCER) was formed in 2007 to leverage on the various economic and social advantages of selected areas in the four northern states of Peninsular Malaysia – Kedah, Perlis, Perak and Penang. The Northern Corridor Implementation Authority (NCIA) was established as the body tasked to oversee, plan and execute economic and social development strategies in the NCER by focusing on agriculture, manufacturing and services.

In 2014, the district of Manjung, Perak, was included in the NCER; and this was followed by the rest of Perak in 2016. The northern states that form the NCER remain as the country's most ideal agricultural location with consistent tropical weather as well as vast and fertile land. All the four states have consistently enjoyed economic and political prosperity. The region is strategically located, bordering Thailand and facing the Straits of Malacca. It has the potential to be a world-class trade destination by leveraging on strong relationships with Sumatra and Thailand. The region's border towns such as Pengkalan Hulu-Betong (of Yala province), Padang Besar, Bukit Kayu Hitam-Sadao and Durian Burung-Ban Prakop (of Songkhla) are gateway towns between Malaysia and Thailand that hold potential for economic and social expansion.

Perlis, Penang, Kedah, and northern Perak (comprising the districts of Hulu Perak, Kerian, Kuala Kangsar and Larut, Matang and Selama) combine to form 7 percent of Malaysia's land area, but contributed over 20 percent to the country's GDP, 60 percent of agricultural land, 30 percent of tourism income, and 45 percent of exports in 2011, according to NCIA chief executive Redza Rafiq.

The NCER blueprint was formulated by Sime Darby Berhad. The plan calls for investments totaling RM117 billion over 18 years from 2007 to 2025. Implementation of the plan is divided into three phases. The first phase (2007–2012) involved securing anchor investors and constructing priority infrastructure. The second phase (2012–2020) aims to broaden and deepen private sector involvement, while the final phase (2020–2025) is to achieve regional market leadership through sustainable market-led growth.

== Achievements ==
Among the key initiatives of the NCER was the construction of the Sultan Abdul Halim Muadzam Shah Bridge (or Penang Second Bridge) which opened to traffic in March 2014. As of 2015 the NCIA claims to have created more than 50,000 jobs since the NCER's inception.

=== Manufacturing ===
The region's significant manufacturing GDP growth is largely driven by electrical and electronics ecosystem since the establishment of the industry in the 1970s.

=== Tourism ===
Langkawi in Kedah was awarded the UNESCO Global Geopark status in 2007.

== Strategic Projects & Programmes ==
The plan targets five core economic sectors of the region: agriculture, manufacturing, tourism, logistics, and education and human capital. Penang is a key manufacturing hub in the country and is home to manufacturing plants operated by Dell, Intel and AMD. Penang and the island of Langkawi are well-known tourist destinations in Malaysia; the NCER plans to double tourist receipts and triple tourist expenditure by 2020. The plan will also promote Penang Port as a trans-shipment centre.

== See also ==
- East Coast Economic Region
- Iskandar Malaysia
- Sabah Development Corridor
- Sarawak Corridor of Renewable Energy
