= Greater Kuala Lumpur =

Greater Kuala Lumpur Kuala Lumpur Raya
- Metropolitan area
- National Growth Conurbation; Konurbasi Pertumbuhan Nasional
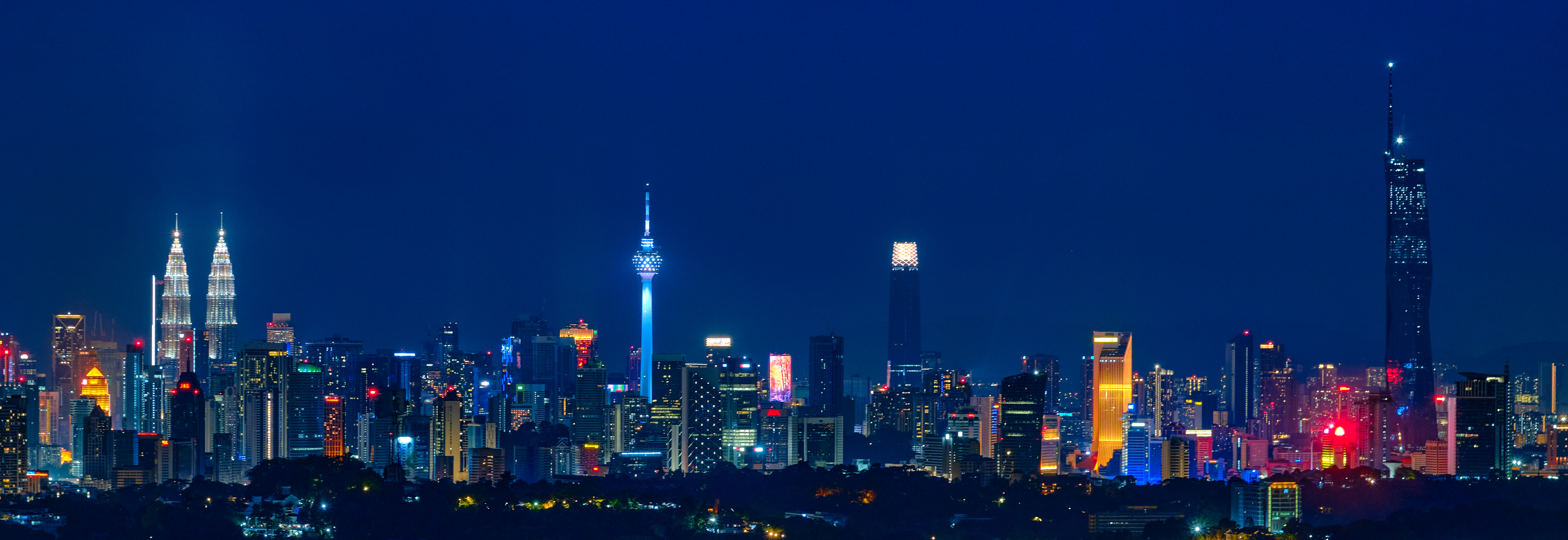
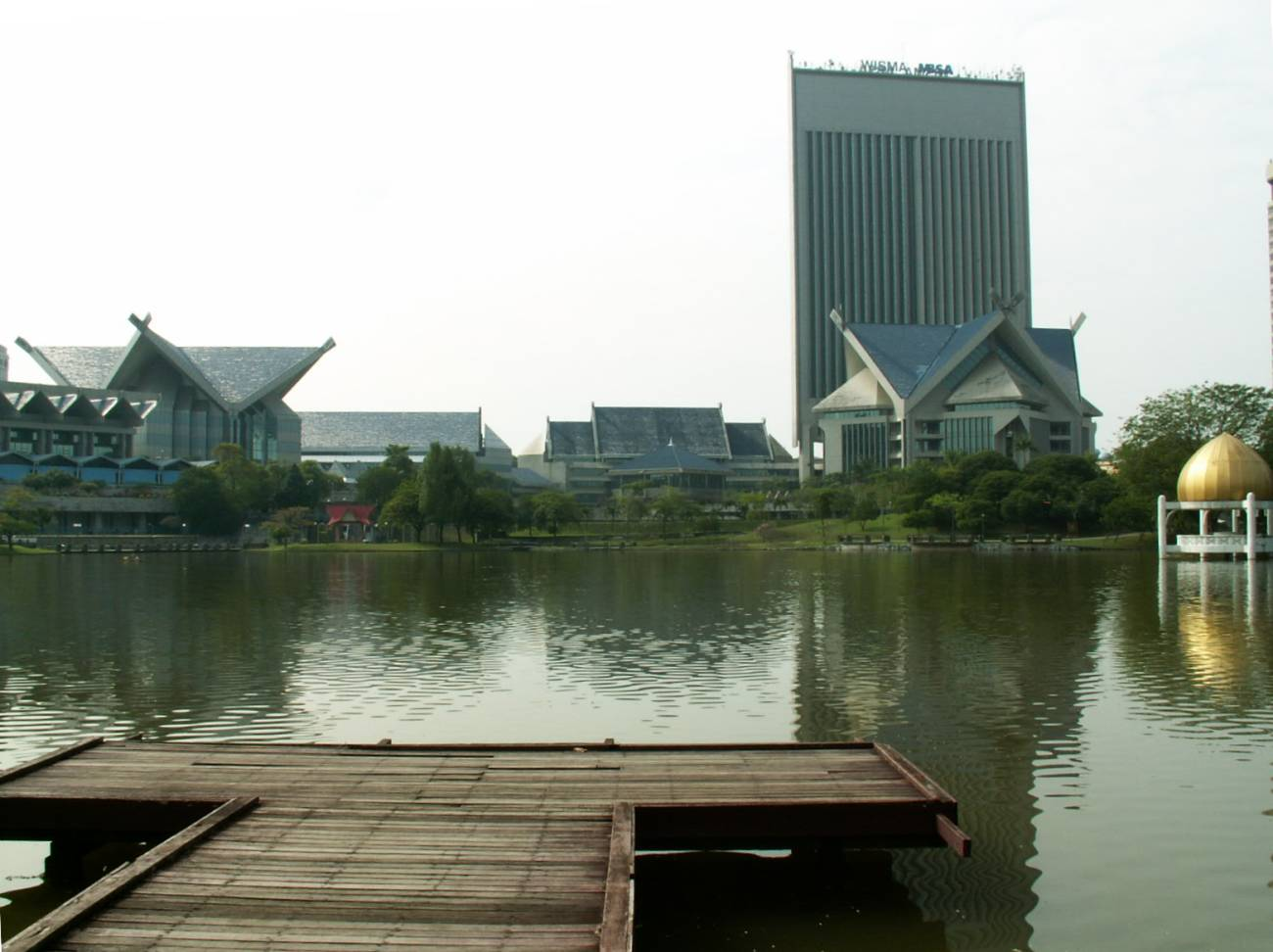
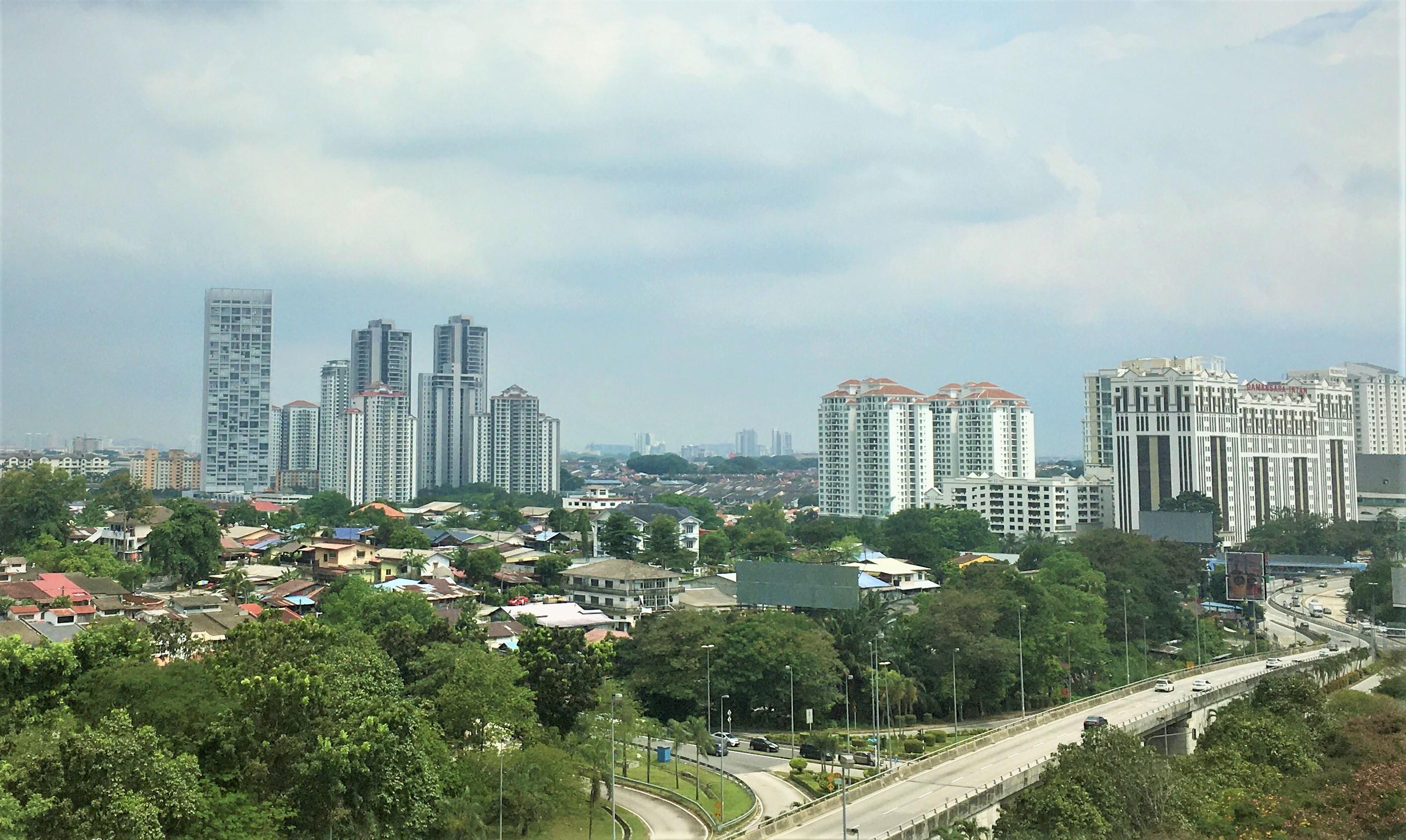
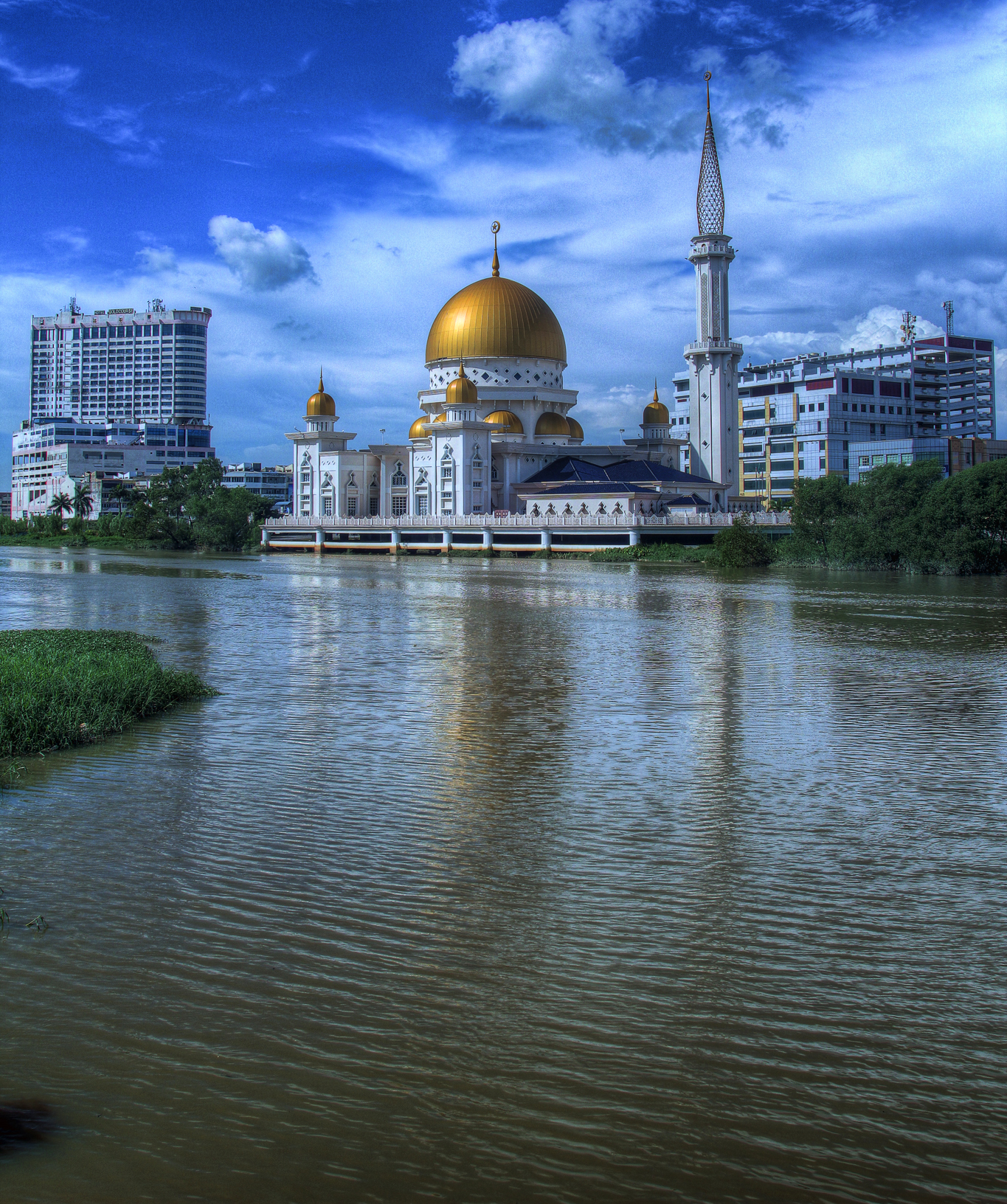
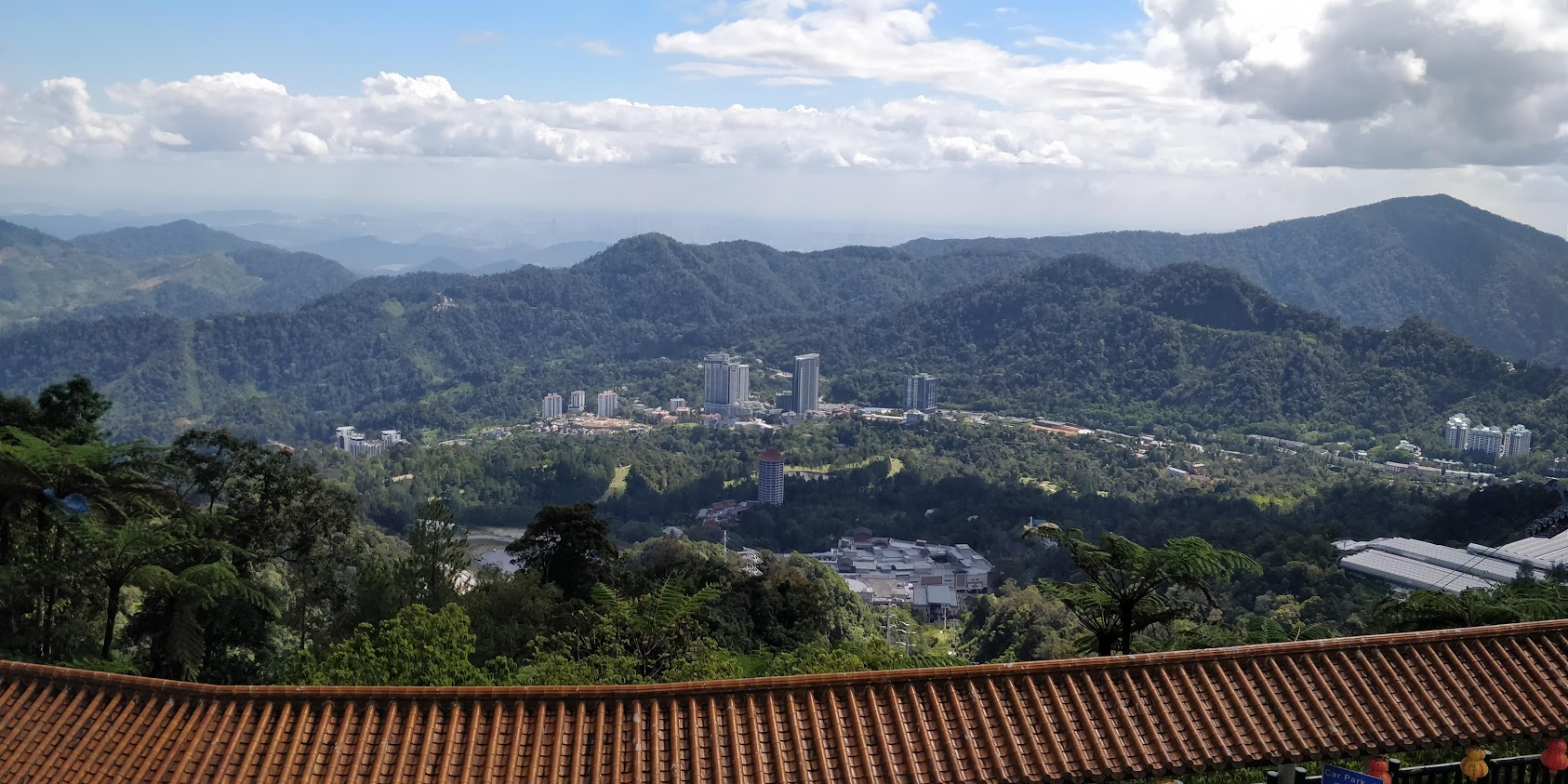
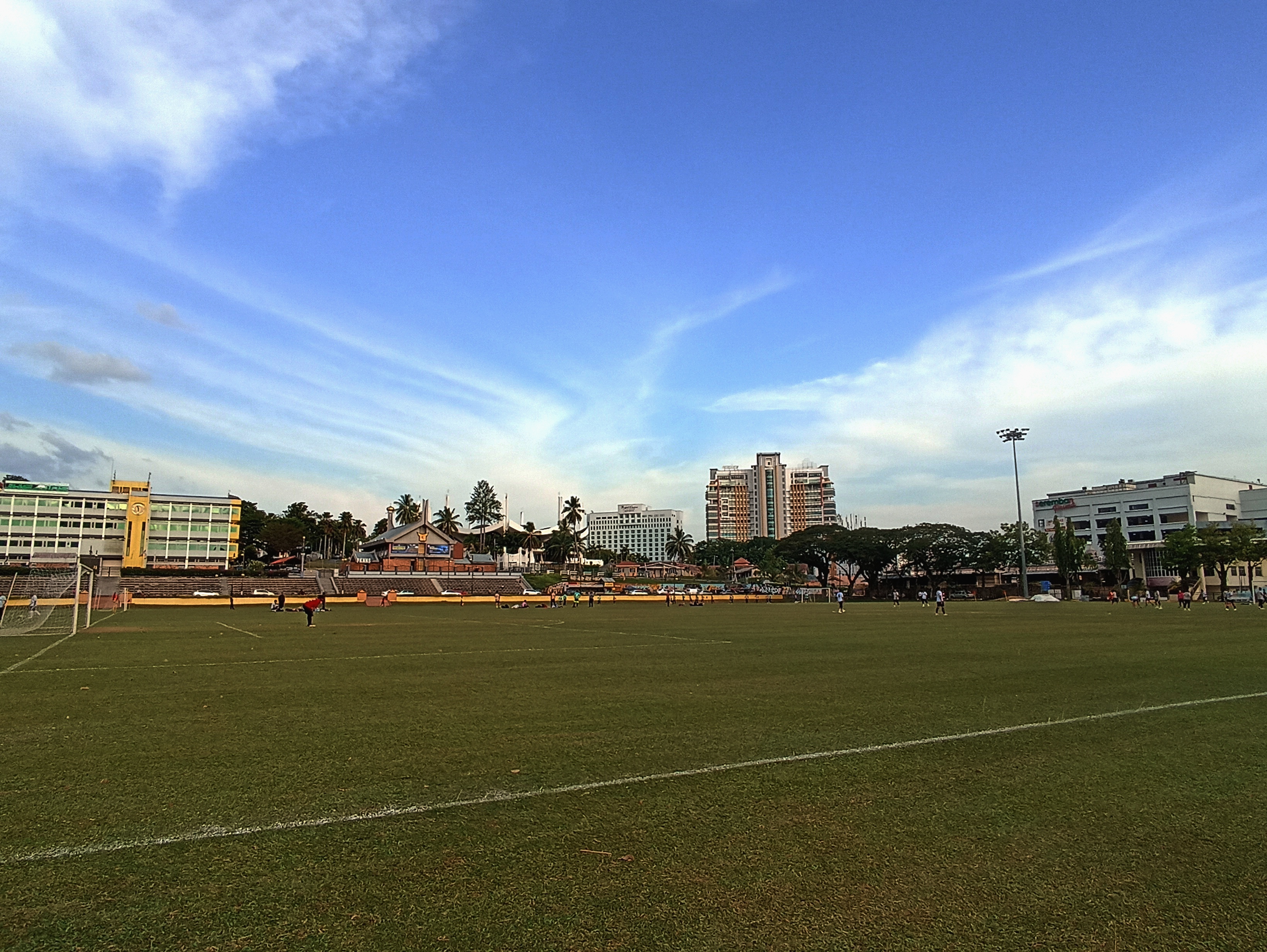
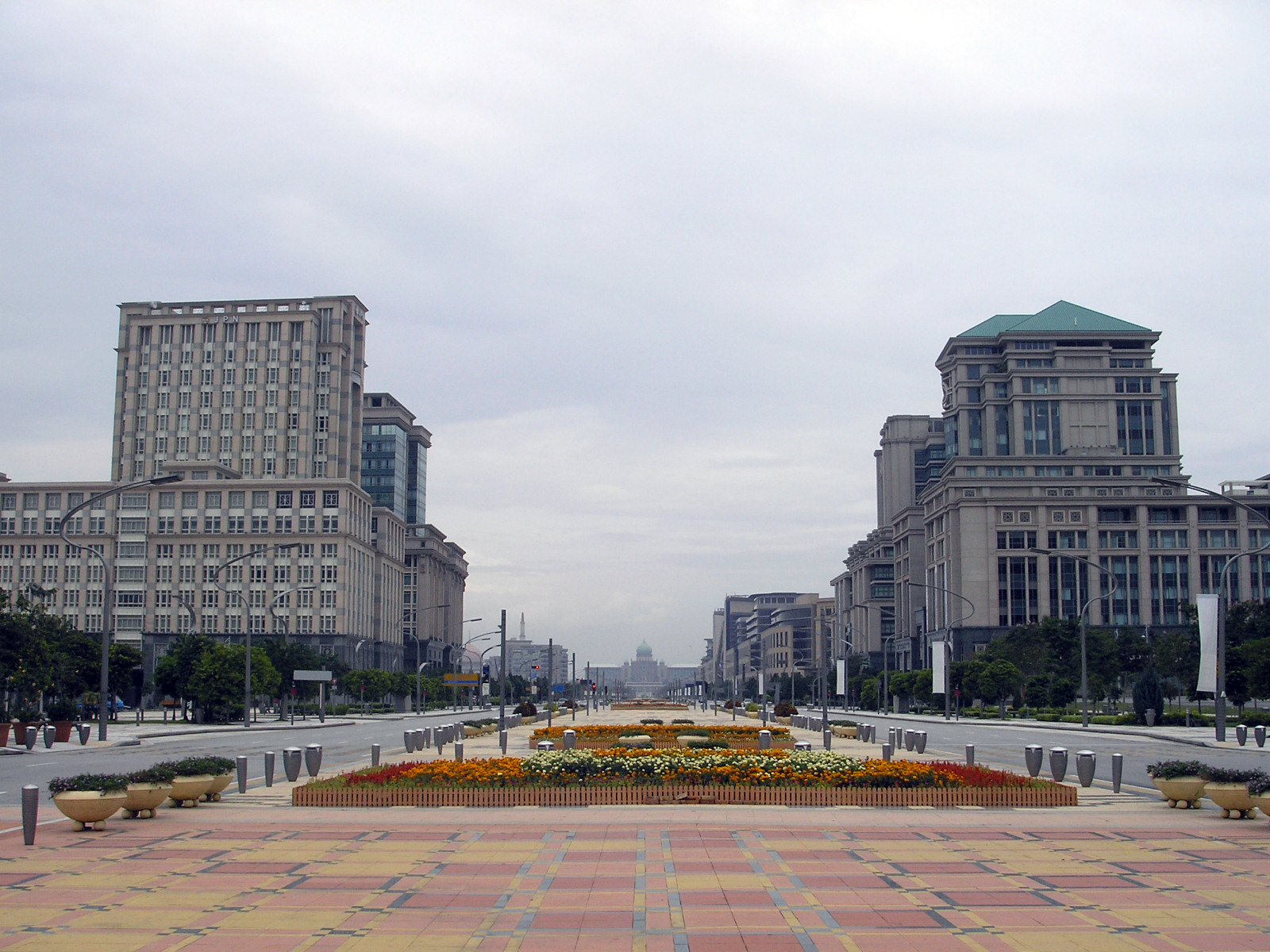
- Kuala Lumpur Shah Alam Petaling Jaya Klang Genting Highlands Seremban Putrajaya
Interactive map of Greater Kuala Lumpur
Kuala Lumpur & Putrajaya
Petaling District
Gombak District
Hulu Langat District
Sepang District
Kuala Langat District
Klang District
Kuala Selangor District
Sabak Bernam District
Hulu Selangor District
Muallim District
Bentong District
Seremban District
Port Dickson District
- Country: Malaysia
- Region: (Federal Territories of Malaysia) Federal Territories; Selangor; Pahang; Negeri Sembilan; Perak

Area
  - Total: 12,668 km^{2} (4,891 sq mi)

Population (2026)
  - Total: 10,750,000
  - Density: 848.6/km^{2} (2,198/sq mi)

GDP
  - Total: US$ 218 billion
  - Per capita: US$ 20,280
- Time zone: UTC+8 (MST)
- Area code(s): 03, 05, 06, 09

Greater Kuala Lumpur (Malay: Kuala Lumpur Raya) is the geographical term that determines the boundaries of metropolitan Kuala Lumpur in Malaysia. Though similar to the term "Klang Valley", there remains a variation between the two. Greater Kuala Lumpur is ranked as the 30th-largest in Asia.

== History ==
=== Pre-1974 ===
Kuala Lumpur has been declared the capital city of Federated Malay States in 1896, and when the group of states changes and expands to Federation of Malaya and later Malaysia, the town status has been kept as such. However, Kuala Lumpur itself is part of the larger Kuala Lumpur district of Selangor, which area also includes Ampang, Batu Caves, Gombak, Ulu Klang, Petaling Jaya, Puchong and Sungai Buloh. Until 1974, the city remains as part of Selangor.

Developments has been ongoing out of the city border long before it as Petaling Jaya was made a new township just beside Kuala Lumpur, converted from Effingham rubber estate on 1952 to accommodate the growing population of the capital and road infrastructures like newly opened Jalan Klang Lama spurs the growth of towns around the original Klang Valley corridor areas. Batu Caves and Kajang, both situated just north and south of the city border also already served as feeder towns of the capital, being the original north-south access point.

With Singapore's exit from the federation, Port Swettenham (Port Klang) is now Malaysia's new port, boosting potentials for growth along the Klang River corridor. This is supported with major infrastructure development, such as Federal Highway as the main direct access from Port Klang to the capital, and Subang Airport, then Malaysia's main airport, is also situated there.

Kuala Lumpur was declared a city in 1972, the first after independence. However due to political factors which rose concerns about its governance as the federal capital, Kuala Lumpur was carved out of Selangor to become the first Federal Territory, now directly governed by the Federal Government.

Historical district maps of Selangor showing district boundaries before the 1974 and 1975 revisions. The area marked in pink red roughly indicates Greater Kuala Lumpur, while the entire area enclosed within the red boundary, including the light pink, pink red and orange zones, represents the Klang Valley.

=== After 1974 ===
Kuala Lumpur's exclusion affected Selangor district boundaries such that there remains parts of original Kuala Lumpur district not included in the territory. From this, the new Petaling and Gombak districts were formed, taking new areas from Klang and Hulu Selangor as well. Sepang, while not originally part of any of Kuala Lumpur areas, was also made a full district due to the revisions, carved out from Hulu Langat and Kuala Langat district.

Klang was made a temporary state capital of Selangor from 1974 to 1977, where a new state capital is declared in Sungai Renggam, later renamed as Shah Alam. Sungai Renggam has been marked for development as the new state administration center back in 1963. The construction of the new main campus of Universiti Teknologi MARA also accompany the new capital development. In Hulu Langat, a new township of Bandar Baru Bangi was being built on the site of Westcountry Estate between Kajang and Bangi to accompany the development of the new main campus of National University of Malaysia (UKM) by Selangor State Development Corporation (PKNS). Similar situation happened in Serdang where University of Putra Malaysia (formerly known as Universiti Pertanian Malaysia) build their main campus there, spurring new townships around Serdang and Seri Kembangan.

In Gombak, Kuala Lumpur–Karak Expressway is built to provide closer access from the capital to the East Coast states as well, with Genting Highlands included as part of its route.

=== 1980s ===
In the 1980s, new township development from the past decades started to take their shape. With the country moved into large scale industrialization, more township around the capital starts to emerge.

The North–South Expressway is developed to become the new major expressway that connect Kuala Lumpur to other states on the West Coast of the peninsular. While most of it runs parallel to the existing Federal Route 1, the first section in the area, Kuala Lumpur–Seremban Expressway, opened in 1982 provide straight access to Seremban, Negeri Sembilan state capital along with access to new developments of Nilai, Seri Kembangan and Bandar Baru Bangi. Another section, New Klang Valley Expressway runs parallel to Federal Highway, linking northern part of the Klang Valley area from Bukit Lanjan of Petaling Jaya to Bukit Raja of Klang, with an exit leads to the Subang Airport.

Other than the state administration centre, Shah Alam town area now hosts industrial areas as well, with sites includes Malaysia's first automotive company Proton headquarter and first main production plant which started operating in 1984.

Port Klang Authority started moving towards privatisation with divesting their current container terminal to a private entity, Klang Container Terminal Berhad. At the same time, a bypass road from Sungai Rasau was built to help divert traffic to the main port area from Federal Highway named North Klang Straits Bypass, the first privately operated toll road in the Klang Valley area.

=== 1990s ===
The 1990s saw a major expansion of the metropolitan area of Kuala Lumpur with various megaproject taking shapes around the area.

A new airport for Kuala Lumpur (Kuala Lumpur International Airport, KLIA) and a new federal government administration centre has been planned to replace their current location in Kuala Lumpur and Subang, chosen to be in Sepang and in Prang Besar Estate respectively, where later the location is named Putrajaya. Both started operational between 1998 and 1999. As Kuala Lumpur is also the host of 1998 Commonwealth Games, new national sport centre has been built in Bukit Jalil, including the new Bukit Jalil National Stadium that is capable to host 100,000 attendants, and Selangor also built their own Shah Alam Stadium.

Due to the approximate of these megaprojects between each other and the city center of Kuala Lumpur, a special economic corridor, Multimedia Super Corridor (MSC) is established. The corridor aims to be a high-technology economic development area in Klang Valley, and includes Kuala Lumpur, Putrajaya, Puchong, Serdang and Nilai of Negeri Sembilan as well as the new township established next to Putrajaya, Cyberjaya which will be one of the main area of the corridor.

Port Klang expands their activity by establishing a new cargo terminal in Pulau Indah, which later called Westport. Another terminal, Northport was opened in 2000 and situated in the northern area of the Klang District.

Road infrastructure takes a boost from these megaprojects with new expressways around the area, such as North–South Expressway Central Link linking both sections of North-South Highway from Nilai to Shah Alam, passing through KLIA and Putrajaya and Shah Alam Expressway from Bukit Jalil of Kuala Lumpur to Pulau Indah of Klang, running south of Federal Highway. Others like Damansara–Puchong Expressway and Cheras–Kajang Expressway exists as upgrades of existing artery and municipal roads into bigger highways.

Public transportation improved heavily with introduction of light rail transit system of Kelana Jaya line and Ampang and Sri Petaling lines, which run through Kuala Lumpur areas and also part of Petaling Jaya. Existing railways were turned into electrified double track from Rawang to Seremban (including Sentul and most of Port Klang branch), paving way for the new KTM Komuter commuter rail system.

All other new residential and commercial areas also starts to grow such as Kota Kemuning in southern Shah Alam, UEP Subang Jaya (later abbreviated as USJ), Bandar Sultan Suleiman in north of Klang, Bandar Baru Selayang in Gombak, Bandar Utama in Petaling Jaya, Salak Tinggi in Sepang. Some new municipalities also has been formed or upgraded as a result of these growth, such as Selayang Municipal Council (upgraded from Gombak District Council), Subang Jaya Municipal Council (upgraded from Petaling District Council) and Ampang Jaya Municipal Council (newly formed from Ampang and Ulu Klang parts of Hulu Langat and Gombak). Shah Alam City Council has also been formed in 1999, upgraded from municipality status, marking the first Selangor city after Kuala Lumpur separation.

=== 2000s ===
While lesser megaprojects took place in this period, effects from most of the projects from the 1990s started to kick in and generates expansion of the area to its current form.

KLIA and Putrajaya allows neighbourhoods in southern Selangor and northern Negeri Sembilan to grow, merging Seremban, Nilai, Port Dickson and Banting into the metropolitan area. Industrial projects also is now active in the northern part, allowing Hulu Selangor and Kuala Selangor to slowly merge into the metropolitan area. Proton's decision to build a new plant in Tanjung Malim (Proton City) allows the conurbation to crawl into the state of Perak, marking its new northern limit.

The population growth also allow more municipalities to be formed, such as Sepang Municipal Council, Bentong Municipal Council and Nilai Municipal Council. Petaling Jaya gains its city status in 2007, marking the third city of the metropolitan area. In the other hand, Putrajaya has been declared as a new Federal Territory, carved out from Selangor as it being the new Federal Government administration area requires it to be managed directly under Federal Government. Putrajaya Corporation, already formed in 1995 to oversee its development, also serve as a municipal-level authority to the new planned city.

More expressways linking areas of the metropolitan starts to operate, such as Guthrie Corridor Expressway (Bukit Jelutong to Rawang), Kuala Lumpur-Putrajaya Expressway (later known as Maju Expressway), Kajang Dispersal Link Expressway (Kajang SILK), and most notably the SMART Tunnel, the hybrid tunnel that also serves as Kuala Lumpur's flood mitigation. In terms of public transportation, the electrification of Ipoh-Rawang sector and Batu Caves branch allows commuter to operate extensively to more areas, up to Tanjung Malim.

=== 2010s ===
This period focuses on solidification of the current metropolitan area, as most of the projects caters to accommodate growing needs of the urban area in terms of jobs, housing and mobility. As such, the area does not expand much anymore but population in the included areas keep growing.

Major development projects such as Seremban 2 and Bandar Seri Sendayan fills the remaining gaps in the Negeri Sembilan part. Acknowledging the growth, the Malaysia Vision Valley was established in 2015, aiming to enhance economic development in the state as part of Greater Kuala Lumpur.

== Definition ==
Evolution of Greater KL

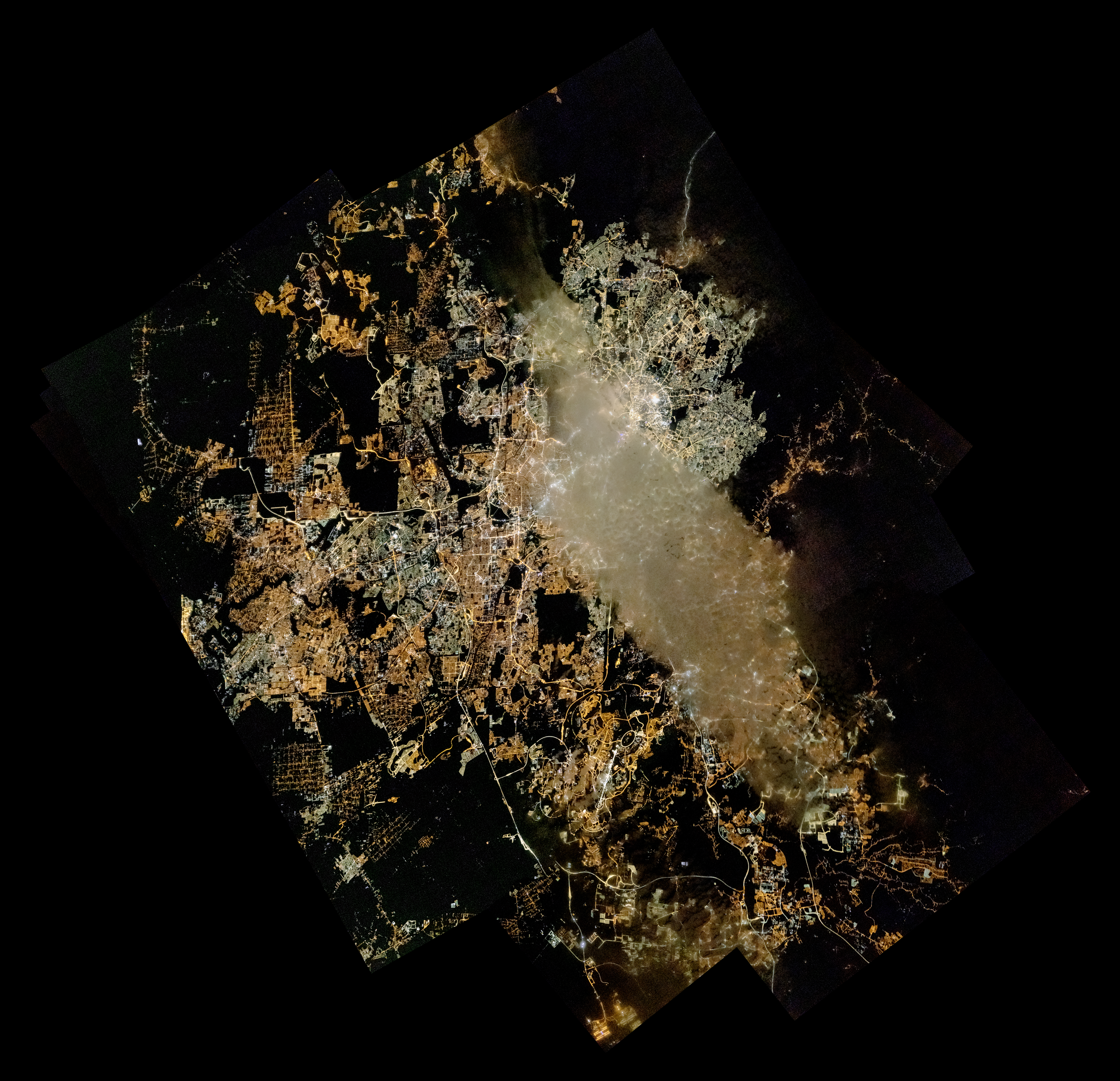
Settlements in Greater KL light out during night

Greater Kuala Lumpur is conterminous with the National Growth Conurbation, which spans the Klang Valley, the Malaysia Vision Valley region in western Negeri Sembilan to the south, and the topographically mountainous western frontier of Pahang to the east. The conurbation also reaches its northern limit at the town of Tanjung Malim in southern Perak. It is defined as an area covered by 17 municipalities surrounding Kuala Lumpur as the central economic area. Each of the municipal areas are governed by separate local authorities.

== Usage ==
The term "Greater Kuala Lumpur" is a relatively new term as compared to the more prevalent and established Klang Valley term, and is often mistaken for Klang Valley despite both having two different definitions.

== Statistics ==
In 2010, the Greater KL population was estimated at close to seven million and it contributed about RM263 billion to the nation's Gross National Income (GNI). Kuala Lumpur ranks 79th out of 140 cities in the Economist Intelligence Unit's survey on liveability.

== Cities/towns/areas within Greater Kuala Lumpur ==
State	area total km2	Local authority	City/town/populated area
(Federal Territories of Malaysia) Federal Territory of Kuala Lumpur	243	Kuala Lumpur City Hall	Kuala Lumpur CBD Maluri and Cheras; Kepong; Segambut (incl. Mont Kiara, TTDI, Damansara Heights); Sentul, Batu and Titiwangsa; Setapak/Wangsa Maju; Setiawangsa and Ampang Hilir; Lembah Pantai, Mid Valley City and Bangsar; Jalan Klang Lama and OUG; Bandar Tasik Selatan and Salak South Sri Petaling; Bukit Jalil and Sungai Besi
Selangor	8,104	Shah Alam City Council	Shah Alam; Batu Tiga; Sungai Buloh incl. Kwasa Damansara and Elmina; Kota Kemuning; Subang (Sultan Abdul Aziz Shah Airport); Setia Alam; Putra Heights (west)
Selangor	8,104	Kajang Municipal Council	Kajang; Semenyih; Balakong (Cheras 11 Miles); Bandar Baru Bangi and Bangi Lama Beranang (Eco Majestic); Broga; Hulu Langat town
Selangor	8,104	Subang Jaya City Council	Subang Jaya including USJ; Bandar Sunway Puchong and Bandar Kinrara; Seri Kembangan; Batu Tiga(partial)
Selangor	8,104	Klang Royal City Council	Klang; Port Swettenham; Pandamaran; Johan Setia; Kapar; Kota Kemuning (partial) Meru; Pulau Indah; Pulau Ketam
Selangor	8,104	Petaling Jaya City Council	Petaling Jaya; Kelana Jaya; Ara Damansara; Damansara incl. Bandar Utama Sungai Buloh incl. Kota Damansara and Bandar Sri Damansara
Selangor	8,104	Selayang Municipal Council	Selayang and Bandar Baru Selayang Gombak; Batu Caves; Rawang; Kuang; Batu Arang; Kundang; Kepong (partial); Genting Sempah
Selangor	8,104	Ampang Jaya Municipal Council	Ampang; Pandan Indah; Pandan Jaya; Ulu Klang; Melawati; Klang Gates Dam
Selangor	8,104	Sepang Municipal Council	Kuala Lumpur International Airport; Cyberjaya; Salak Tinggi/Kota Warisan Dengkil; Sepang town Sungai Pelek; Tanjong Sepat
Selangor	8,104	Kuala Langat Municipal Council	Banting; Telok Panglima Garang; Jugra; Morib; Bandar Saujana Putra; Carey Island Jenjarom
Selangor	8,104	Kuala Selangor Municipal Council	Kuala Selangor incl. Bukit Malawati Tanjung Karang; Puncak Alam; Bukit Cherakah; Ijok; Jeram
Selangor	8,104	Hulu Selangor Municipal Council	Kuala Kubu Bharu; Ampang Pechah; Serendah; Batang Kali; Resorts World Genting (western 25%); Bukit Beruntung; Kalumpang; Hulu Bernam
(Federal Territories of Malaysia) Federal Territory of Putrajaya	49	Putrajaya Corporation	Putrajaya
Negeri Sembilan	1507.37	Seremban City Council	Seremban; Nilai; Mantin; Labu, Tiroi and Bandar Enstek; Senawang and Sungai Gadut; Rantau incl. Bandar Sri Sendayan; Lenggeng
Negeri Sembilan	1507.37	Port Dickson Municipal Council	Port Dickson; Lukut; Linggi
Pahang	1,831.12	Bentong Municipal Council	Bentong; Resorts World Genting (majority); Genting Sempah; Karak; Lurah Bilut
Perak	934.35	Tanjong Malim Municipal Council	Tanjong Malim
Total area	12,668.84		

== List of Greater KL districts by population ==
Rank	District	State	Population
1	Petaling	Selangor	2,298,123
2	Kuala Lumpur	Federal Territories	1,982,112
3	Hulu Langat	Selangor	1,400,461
4	Klang	Selangor	1,088,942
5	Gombak	Selangor	942,336
6	Seremban	Negeri Sembilan	692,407
7	Sepang	Selangor	324,935
8	Kuala Langat	Selangor	307,787
9	Kuala Selangor	Selangor	281,753
10	Hulu Selangor	Selangor	243,029
11	Port Dickson	Negeri Sembilan	128,689
12	Bentong	Pahang	116,799
13	Putrajaya	Federal Territories	109,202
14	Muallim	Perak	76,688
Total			9,993,263

== See also ==
Metropolitan areas of Malaysia

- George Town Conurbation
- Johor Bahru Conurbation
- Kinta Valley
- Greater Kuching
- Greater Kota Kinabalu
