= Tiroi =

Town in Seremban District, Nigeri Sembilan, Malaysia

Coordinates: 2°45′N 101°52′E

Tiroi in Seremban District

Tiroi is a small town and mukim in Seremban District, Negeri Sembilan, Malaysia. It is located nearby Labu town. Located near Tiroi are modern development projects such as Bandar Ainsdale.

== Transportation ==
Tiroi is served by the Tiroi Komuter Station, between Seremban railway station and Labu Komuter station, on the KTM Komuter Seremban Line. The town is also served by Federal Route 362 Jalan Labu which connects Nilai and Labu to Seremban. Although not served directly by the North-South Expressway, the Bandar Ainsdale exit is not far from Tiroi town.
