= Seremban 2 =

- Suburb of Seremban
- Interactive map of Seremban 2
- Country: Malaysia
- State: Negeri Sembilan
- District: Seremban
- Luak: Sungai Ujong

Government
  - Body: Seremban City Council
  - Mayor: Masri Baharuddin
  - MP: Cha Kee Chin (PH–DAP)
  - MLA: Nicole Tan Lee Koon (PH–DAP)
- Elevation: 57 m (187 ft)
- Time zone: UTC+8 (Malaysia Standard Time)
  - Summer (DST): Not applicable
- Postcode: 70300

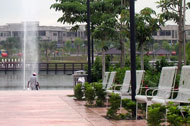
Seremban 2 City Park

Seremban 2 is a planned satellite town located about four kilometers southeast of downtown Seremban in Seremban District, Negeri Sembilan, Malaysia. It also borders the suburban areas of Bandar Sri Sendayan to its west and Mambau to its south.

Located west of the North-South Expressway's EXIT 218, the township is built on a former oil palm plantation site. It was established to relocate the administrative, business and education services in Negeri Sembilan away from the capital. Several shopping malls have been opened in Seremban 2, such as ÆON, CarePlus Mall, Lotus's, Mydin and NSK Trade City.

Seremban 2 covers over 2,300 acres (9 km^{2}) of land, including the Seremban District Administrative Complex, the Seremban Court Complex, the Seremban District Police Headquarters and the Fire and Rescue Department Headquarters NSW. S2 Heights, part of Seremban 2 covers over 1,500 acres (6 km^{2}) which made the total area of Seremban 2 to 3,800 acres (15 km^{2}).

== Neighbourhoods ==
=== Low rise ===
- Green Street Homes
- Sri Carcosa
- Central Park
- Emerald Park
- Garden Homes
- Garden Avenue
- Garden City Homes
- Vision Homes
- S2 Heights
- Uptown Avenue
- Park Avenue
- Pearl 132
- City Park
- Acacia
- Seremban 2 City Centre
- Aviva Green
- Saujana Duta
- Saujana Prima
- Saujana Tropika
- Symphony
- Melody
- Centrio
  - Ikon
- Vio Banj'ran

=== High rise ===
- Kalista
- Safira

== Infrastructures ==
=== Administrative services ===
- Seremban District and Land Office
- Seremban High Court
- National Audit Department (Negeri Sembilan branch office)

=== Education ===
- SJK(C) Tung Hua
- SK Seremban 2A
- SK Seremban 2B
- SK Wawasan
- SMK Seremban 2
- SMK Bukit Kepayang
- Zenith International School

=== Healthcare ===
- Seremban 2 Health Clinic (public)
- Sehat Healthcare Centre (private)
- Columbia Asia (private)

=== Recreational ===
- S2 City Park
- Tan Sri Dato' Haji Mohd Said Sports Complex

=== Places of worship ===
- Hussain Mosque

== Development ==
Seremban 2, IJM Land's flagship development in Negeri Sembilan is a 2,300 acres self-contained township. To date, Seremban 2 is regarded as one of the most progressive and successful developments in Negeri Sembilan, and the development is currently at 90% completion with a population of 62,000.

Seremban 2 is strategically located 4 km from the Seremban toll plaza and 9 km from Seremban town. Accessibility to the township via the North–South Expressway (E2), ELITE (E6) and LEKAS (E21) highways have brought Seremban 2 closer to crucial locations such as Kuala Lumpur, the Kuala Lumpur International Airport (30 minutes), Putrajaya and Cyberjaya (30 minutes).

Seremban 2 serves as the gateway to the Klang Valley and part of the Malaysia Vision Valley development corridor under the National Structural Plan, which gazetted 30% of Negeri Sembilan, including Port Dickson, Nilai and Labu. This is part of the Federal Government initiatives to bring development to the region.

Seremban 2 offers a wide selection of beautifully designed homes ranging from affordable apartments to well-planned terrace houses and from super linked and semi-detached houses to exclusive gated bungalows. Seremban 2 comprises 9 residential communities, 5 schools, a 15-acre City Lake Park, a Sports Complex, a modern Shopping Centre, and Commercial Business Parks. Seremban 2 is also home to the state government and local authorities.

== Ongoing projects ==
Under IJM Land
