= Malaysia Vision Valley =

Special economic zone in Negeri Sembilan, Malaysia

Malaysia Vision Valley Lembah Wawasan Malaysia
- Special economic zone
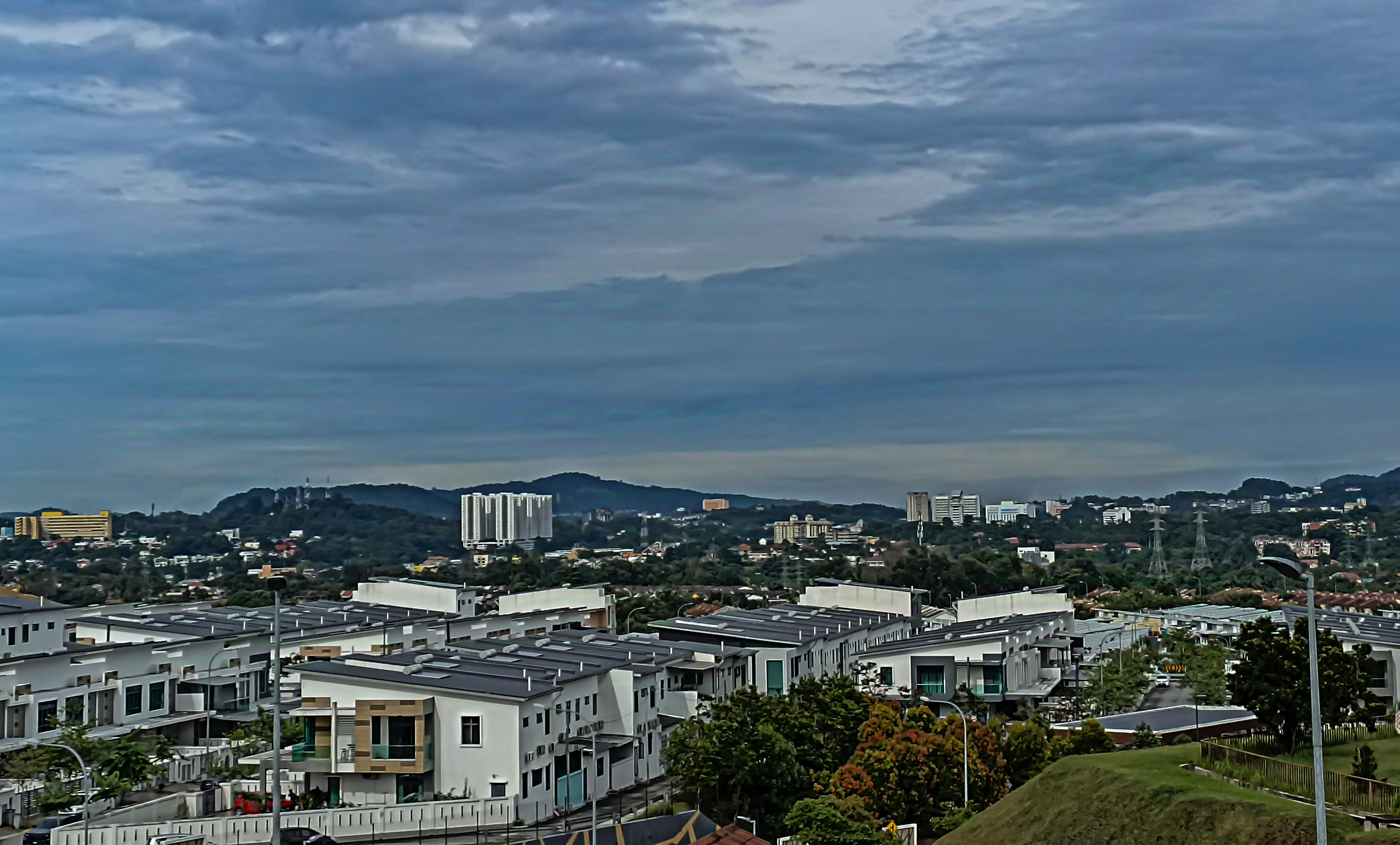
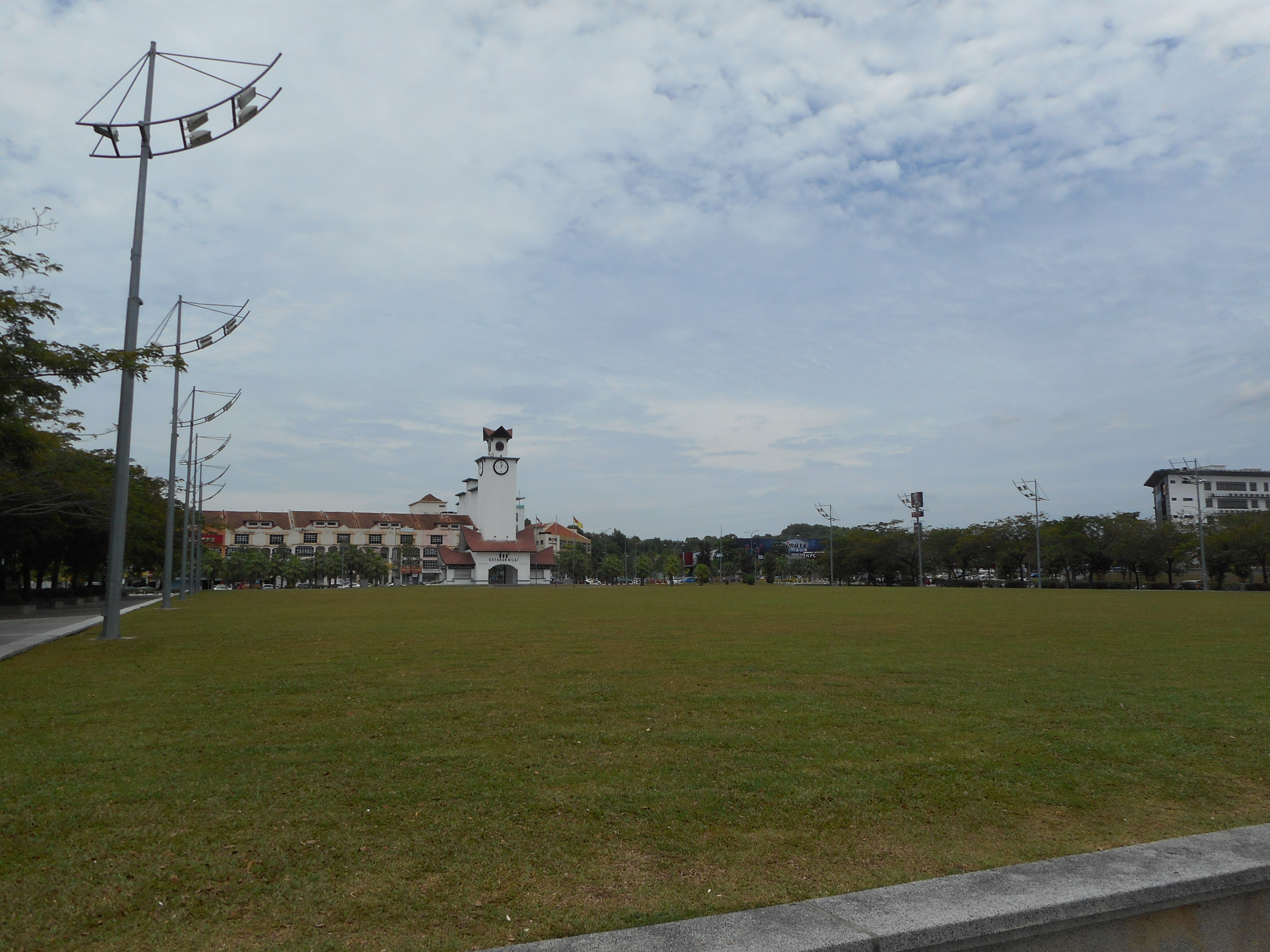
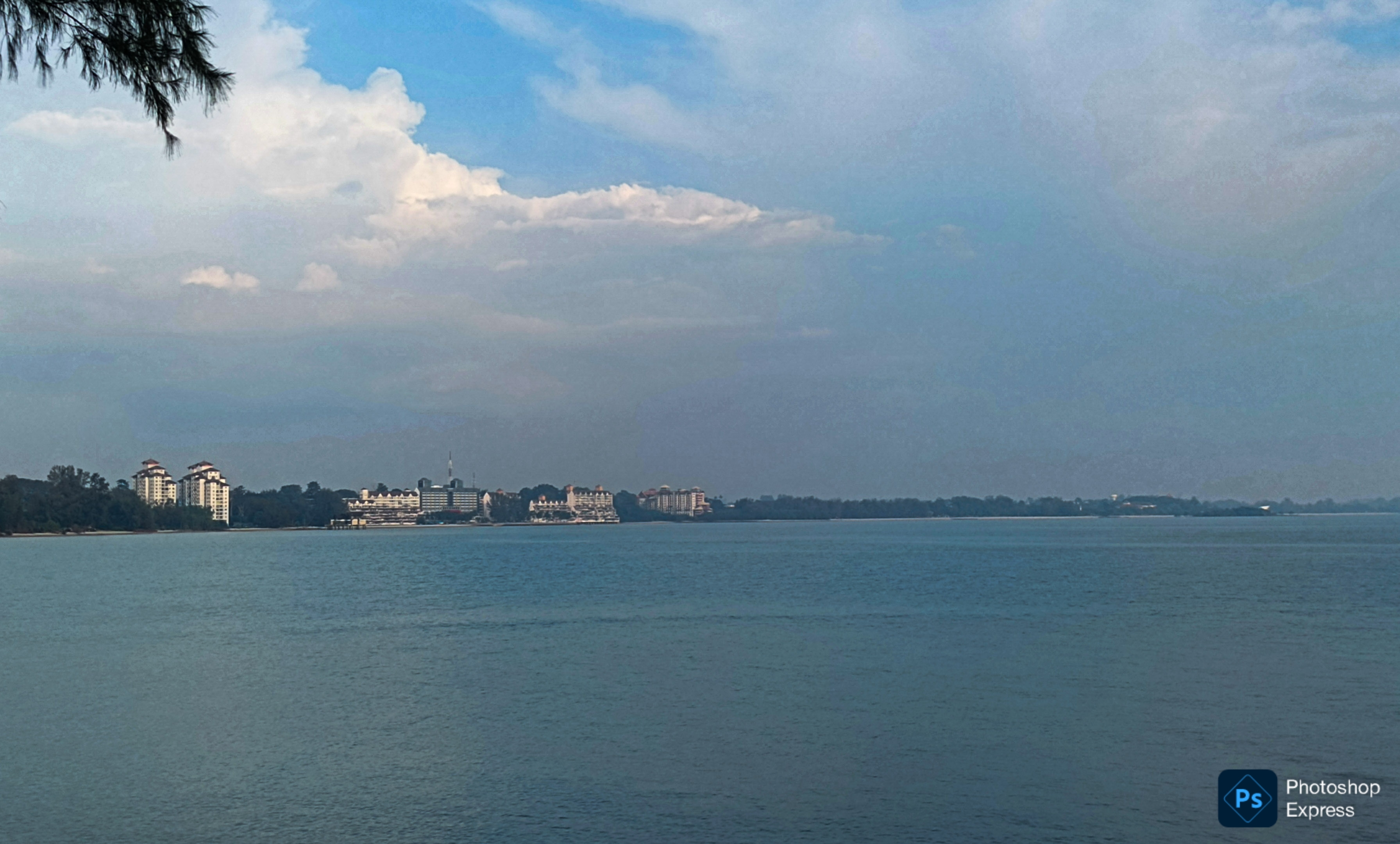
- The principal urban areas of the MVV. From top, clockwise: Seremban, Port Dickson and Nilai
- Country: Malaysia
- State: Negeri Sembilan
- Districts: Seremban; Port Dickson
- Launched: 21 May 2015 (original); 13 December 2018 (current)

Government
  - Statutory body: NS Corporation (NS Corp)
  - Chairman: Ismail Lasim

Area
  - Total: 1,534 km^{2} (592 sq mi)

Population (2020)
  - Total: 820,972
- Time zone: UTC+8 (Malaysian Standard Time)
  - Summer (DST): not applicable
- Postcode: 70xxx-71xxx
- Website: https://nscorp.gov.my/

The Malaysia Vision Valley (MVV; Malay: Lembah Wawasan Malaysia) is a development corridor that encompasses the districts of Seremban and Port Dickson in the state of Negeri Sembilan, Malaysia. The corridor was initially established on 21 May 2015, and it forms the southern continuation of the Greater Kuala Lumpur area.

== Background ==
Greater Kuala Lumpur, with the city proper of Seremban recognizable at the lower right.

The state of Negeri Sembilan has a very close proximity to the heavily developed Klang Valley area and is very well connected via major arteries. Driven by the increase of commuters from the state commuting daily to work, including topographic factors - where the corridor between Kuala Lumpur and Negeri Sembilan is relatively flatter compared to the north - the urban sprawl of the Klang Valley has been seen to push southwards over the years, causing new developments to spur up in bordering districts, especially Seremban and Port Dickson - both are also part of the National Conurbation.

Plans of launching a development corridor spanning the two Negri districts were mooted since 2009 under the master plan conceived by Sime Darby Property but was pigeonholed due to the global economic slump. Under the leadership of Mohamad Hasan, the Menteri Besar of Negeri Sembilan, and Prime Minister-cum-Finance Minister, Najib Razak, the first iteration of the MVV was inaugurated in 2015, with Sime Darby acting as a major player in the development of the corridor. It is a key component of the Eleventh Malaysia Plan (11MP), the National Physical Plan (NPP), and the state's 45-year modernization plan, which intends to decentralize the development of neighboring Klang Valley, and poising western Negeri Sembilan as the southern extension of Greater Kuala Lumpur. The megaproject harnesses the spillover effect from the rapid development of Greater Kuala Lumpur, aiming to drastically stimulate the economic growth at the state and national levels, with a long-term goal to prepare Negeri Sembilan in becoming a developed state by 2045.

Following the defeat of Barisan Nasional government in the 14th Malaysian general election, the project was eventually shelved. After being revised and restructured, Malaysia Vision Valley 2.0 (MVV2.0), the project's second and current iteration, was launched on 13 December 2018 by the incumbent Menteri Besar, Aminuddin Harun. Since then, NS Corporation (NS Corp) has been the statutory body responsible in establishing the MVV's direction, policies, and strategies, and it is slated to create at over 600,000 job opportunities to Negri citizens, and contribute up to 15% of Malaysia's gross domestic product (GDP).

== Geography ==
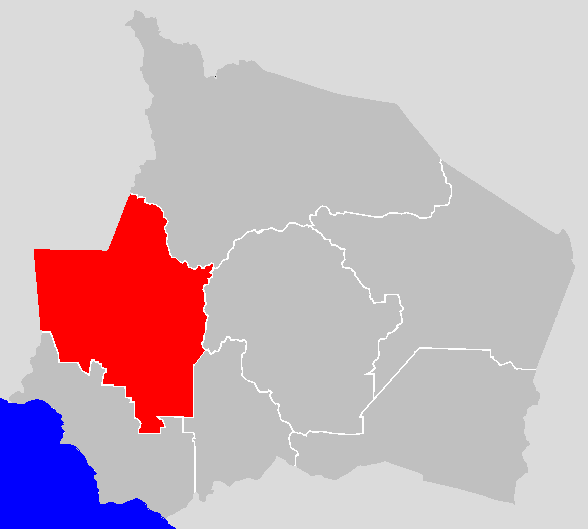
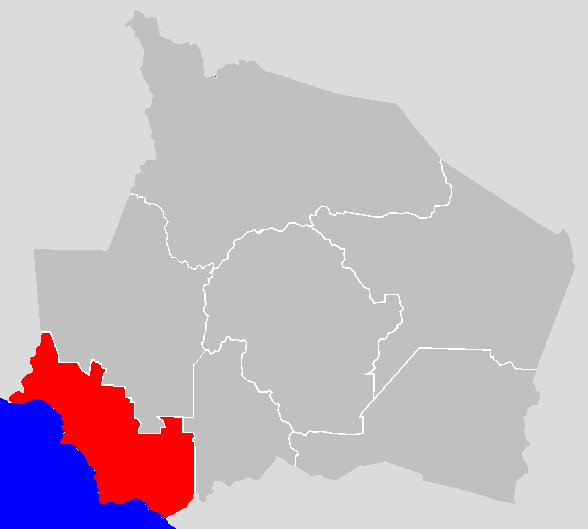
The MVV spans both districts of Seremban (top) and Port Dickson (bottom).

The Malaysia Vision Valley is located immediately south of the Klang Valley, covering the districts of Seremban and Port Dickson in the western half of Negeri Sembilan, roughly defined by the Nilai–Seremban–Port Dickson growth triangle. It directly borders the MSC Malaysia corridor to its north.

In comparison, the MVV is twice the size of Singapore but one and a half times smaller than Johor's Iskandar Malaysia, with a total land area of 1,534 km².

== Development plan ==
The current version of the Malaysia Vision Valley consists of six developmental parcels:

- Parcel A - Negeri Sembilan High Tech Industrial Park, which is the first phase of the MVV. The major projects within this parcel are Hamilton Nilai City (by Sime Darby Property) and a bypass linking Nilai and Labu to Bandar Enstek. Outlying projects include Nilai Vision City (developed by GD Property) as well as the township of Nilai Impian and XME Business Park, both under Sime Darby Property.
- Parcel B - Smart County, which will comprise a new central business district, residential and commercial areas, and light to medium industrial areas. The main project in this parcel is the Malaysia Vision Valley City (MVV City), a smart township project jointly developed by Matrix Concepts Holdings and NS Corporation, which would become the centrepiece of the economic corridor as a whole. Furthermore, the Seremban station building for the Kuala Lumpur–Singapore high-speed rail will be built within this parcel shortly. Nearby developments include Kota Seriemas (by Seriemas Development), Bandar Enstek (by TH Properties), Bandar Ainsdale (by Sime Darby Property) and Bandar Sri Sendayan (by Matrix Concepts Holdings).
- Parcel C - Negeri Sembilan Aerospace Valley (NSAV), which is poised to become the main hub of aerospace industry in Malaysia and Asia. The parcel stretches from Bukit Pelanduk to Lukut and Bandar Springhill (by MUI Properties).
- Parcel D - Integrated Maritime Hub and Waterfront Corridor, that encompasses the entire state waters within three nautical miles and is planned to develop the maritime industry and tourism sector in Port Dickson. Projects within this parcel include the development of the Port Dickson Coastal Special Area Plan.
- Parcel E - Situated in Pasir Panjang, approximately 19 kilometres (12 mi) south of downtown Port Dickson, this parcel is slated to host an AI-powered container port and a free-trade zone to supplement the development of the NSAV and complementing Port Klang.
- Parcel F - Negeri Sembilan Semiconductor Valley (NSSV), which focuses on semiconductor industries, aiming to turn Negeri Sembilan into a major semiconductor powerhouse. Located in Senawang, it is the smallest parcel in land area. The other outlying project near this parcel is the SPD Tech Valley (by Seri Pajam).

== See also ==
- East Coast Economic Region
- Eleventh Malaysia Plan
- Greater Kuala Lumpur
- Iskandar Malaysia
- Malaysian national projects
- MSC Malaysia
- Northern Corridor Economic Region
  - The Greater Kedah 2050
- Sabah Development Corridor
- Sarawak Corridor of Renewable Energy
