= Tiroi Komuter station =

Railway station in Labu, Negeri Sembilan, Malaysia

Tiroi

General information
- Other names: Malay: تيروي (Jawi); Chinese: 迪镭; Tamil: திரோய்
- Location: Taman Tiroi, Labu, Negeri Sembilan, Malaysia.
- Coordinates: 2°44′29″N 101°52′18″E
- System: KB12 | Commuter rail station
- Owner: Railway Assets Corporation
- Operator: Keretapi Tanah Melayu
- Line: West Coast Line
- Platforms: 2 side platforms
- Tracks: 2

Construction
- Structure type: At-grade
- Parking: Available
- Accessible: No

Other information
- Station code: KB12

History
- Rebuilt: 1995
- Electrified: 1995

Services
Preceding station	KTM Komuter	Following station
Labu towards Batu Caves	Batu Caves–Pulau Sebang Line	Seremban towards Pulau Sebang/Tampin
Location

Tiroi Komuter station is a KTM Komuter train station located next to the small housing estate of Taman Tiroi, Negeri Sembilan, on the 7th kilometre of Jalan Labu. The Komuter station is named after the town of Tiroi, and is essentially a replacement of the old Tiroi station destroyed by communists during the 1948-1960 Malayan Emergency.

The station strictly serves as a two-platform train halt for the Seremban Line KTM Komuter train service, having prepared facilities to purchase tickets. The station's ticket counter is typically empty, leaving the halt's ticket vending machines to provide any services to passengers. The station, as are virtually all small train halts along the Komuter lines, is situated along two lanes of railroad (two basic routes) designated for trains traveling northbound or southbound. The station is one of a number of Komuter stations that serves very few passengers, but is slowly increasing due to new residential property developments nearby the area, such as Bandar Ainsdale and Seremban 2 Heights.

== See also ==
- Rail transport in Malaysia
