= Bandar Ainsdale =

Coordinates: 2°43′49.3″N 101°53′34.6″E

- Suburb of Seremban
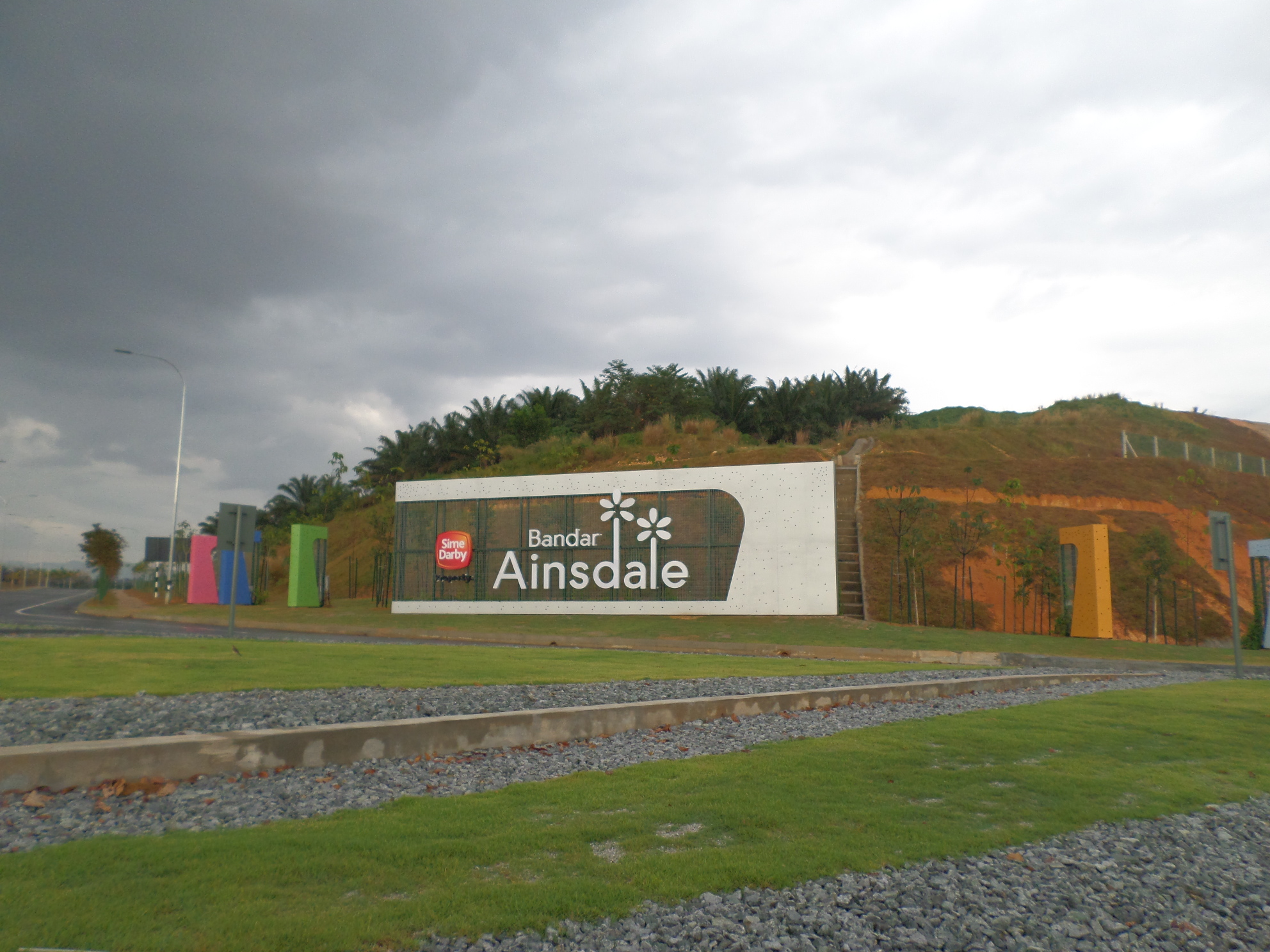
- Interactive map of Bandar Ainsdale
- Country: Malaysia
- State: Negeri Sembilan
- District: Seremban
- Luak: Sungai Ujong

Government
  - Local authority: Seremban City Council
- Elevation: 101 m (331 ft)
- Time zone: UTC+8 (Malaysia Standard Time)
  - Summer (DST): Not applicable
- Postcode: 70200

Bandar Ainsdale is a township in Seremban, Negeri Sembilan, Malaysia. This township is located between Seremban 2 and Labu. It is served by the North–South Expressway Southern Route and KTM Komuter.

== Transportation ==
=== Car ===
North–South Expressway Southern Route, 217 serves Bandar Ainsdale. Bandar Ainsdale is mostly served by Jalan Labu Federal Route 362 which connects Bandar Ainsdale to Seremban, Labu, and Nilai. There are also a few roads connecting Bandar Ainsdale to Seremban 2 and Bandar Sri Sendayan.

=== Rail ===
Bandar Ainsdale is served by Tiroi Komuter station on the KTM Komuter Seremban Line and is just a 5 minute drive from the township.
