= KLIA East @ Labu =

KLIA East @ Labu LTAKL Timur @ Labu
- Artist rendering of KLIA East @ Labu
- IATA: none; ICAO: none

Summary
- Operator: AirAsia, Sime Darby
- Location: Labu, Negeri Sembilan, Malaysia
- Time zone: MST (UTC+08:00)

KLIA East @ Labu, (or KLIA-East or KLIA 2), was a proposed budget carrier international airport. It would have been the third civilian airport serving Kuala Lumpur and the surrounding Greater Klang Valley area in Malaysia, after Kuala Lumpur International Airport (KLIA) and Sultan Abdul Aziz Shah Airport (Subang Airport).

The airport was to be located at Labu, Negeri Sembilan, which is 8.6 kilometres away from KLIA. It was proposed by AirAsia, a Malaysian low-cost airline, to replace its use of the low-cost carrier terminal (LCCT) at KLIA. The airport at Labu was intended to serve AirAsia only, and the other airlines serving Kuala Lumpur, including full-service carriers, low-cost carriers as well as cargo airlines would continue to utilize KLIA.

By road, the airport is 50 km from downtown Kuala Lumpur, compared to the distance of 78 km for KLIA. The construction of the new airport, on a 2,800ha area at the state's central corridor in Labu, would have been financed by the private sector. The two parties involved in this project were AirAsia Holdings Group and Sime Darby who own the land. Construction was planned to start in mid-2009 and the new airport was anticipated to be ready by 2011.

However, after a meeting with the Cabinet Ministers of Malaysia, which includes the Deputy Prime Minister, the government instructed the airport operator of KLIA, Malaysia Airports Holding Berhad, to build a new low-cost carrier terminal at KLIA itself with close consultation with AirAsia. AirAsia will submit its wish list and specifications to the operator for discussion. The new terminal, klia2, started operations on 2 May 2014, with AirAsia moving to klia2 a week later on 9 May.

Currently, the former project site is a proposed site for a Royal Malaysian Air Force base.

== Background ==
Prior to the proposed airport, AirAsia is operating from the LCC terminal of the Kuala Lumpur International Airport. The terminal was initially built with a design capacity of up to 10 million passengers a year which further extension to 15 million passengers a year. It was built on a fast-track basis starting in June 2005 and opened six months later. The site was actually meant for a cargo facility with aprons for aircraft already built.

Demand for AirAsia has caused a surge in the usage of LCC terminal which resulted in almost 9.5 million passengers in 2007. AirAsia was looking for room to expand its operations and decided to use a purpose-built low-cost carrier airport at a site near the current airport. It was reported in December 2008 that Sime Darby, the land owner for the new airport and AirAsia has given a green light for the building of the new airport in Labu, Negeri Sembilan. It was reported that the cost of building the airport will be totally privately funded by both AirAsia and Sime Darby.

The proposal and the speed of the cabinet giving it a green light has attracted many critics, including the former Prime Minister of Malaysia, Mahathir Mohamad. Arguments against the airport include duplication of facilities with the new airport and KLIA, questioning the issues on the airport will be privately funded, as some facilities such as access road may need to be borne by the government and also proximity between the two airports.

Finally, the criticism has made the cabinet reconsider the issue, with the Deputy Prime Minister Najib Razak asking AirAsia to present their case to him and other cabinet ministers and the airport operator Malaysia Airports. After the presentation, the cabinet decided that the proposal is off and asked AirAsia to work with the airport operator to build a new LCC Terminal inside KLIA.

Although there were talks that the decision on the airport has not been finalized yet, Deputy Prime Minister clarify that the project would not commence as Sime Darby lacks funds to initiate infrastructure. He also confirmed that the new LCC terminal will be built within the Kuala Lumpur International Airport.

== Connectivity ==
The KLIA East @ Labu would have been connected with KLIA Main Terminal by:-

- A proposed 7 km branch road to link KLIA East @ Labu to KLIA and the North–South Expressway.
- A proposed 7 km ERL link from KLIA to KLIA East.
- A bus hub at KLIA East.

A 3 km KTM Komuter railway line also had been proposed from the railway station in Labu to KLIA East.

All the costs for building the airport, road and rail links would have been privately financed.

== Funding ==
The funding for the building of the airport is reported to be based on private finance initiative (PFI). Funds are expected to be provided by Sime Darby and AirAsia. However, critics question the validity of the claim as some aspects of the airport operations such as Customs, Immigration and Quarantine facilities may need to be borne by the government. The same argument also goes for other infrastructure such as building new KTM or ERL tracks to the airport.

== Controversies ==
=== Arguments for building the airport ===
AirAsia has launched a cyber-campaign to promote the building and use of the airport. The company's chief executive officer, Tony Fernandes has dubbed the airport as the Rakyat's Terminal (People's Terminal).

On its website, AirAsia has listed several justifications for its need to build a new airport for its own purpose. Among them are:-

- Passenger capacity - Although the current LCC Terminal in KLIA is currently undergoing construction to enable the terminal to handle 15 million passengers a year, AirAsia expects that the terminal will only hold the passenger growth for only one year. The company anticipates handling 25 million passengers through the terminal in 2013 which a shortfall of over 10 million passengers. There were also concerns that MAHB may not be able to build the new LCC Terminal in KLIA on time to accommodate the expanding fleet of AirAsia aircraft. In addition, there have been complaints the present LCCT is "a little more than a shed", and concerns the new LCCT may not be that much better standard.
- Runway capacity - AirAsia claims that KLIA LCC terminal does not have the capacity to cope with peak-hour aircraft movements. They are expecting to have 159 Airbus A320 and 25 widebody Airbus A330 by 2013.
- Connectivity - AirAsia claims that there is poor connectivity on the terminal
- Airport facility - AirAsia claims that waiting time for taxiway has increased due to huge airport layout. They also claimed that the number of gates needed for their operations in the future are insufficient.
- Autonomy - AirAsia purports it would not have any say in the new facilities in KLIA and that Malaysia Airports Berhad, the operators of KLIA, intends to build. The airline fears that landing and other charges could rise. It thus announced a plan to build its own airport which it claims will be built on time and to keep expenses low. There has been frustration by AirAsia in the poor performance of the KLIA operators.

AirAsia has also listed its justification for choosing the site for the airport. Among them are:-

- Location - The new location is cost-efficient, has good connectivity to highways and railway lines, and readily available land. The land is owned by Sime Darby. AirAsia also claimed that the land proposed by the airport operator, Malaysia Airports is unsuitable due to Express Rail Link height and power issues. The land also has poor soil quality making it more expensive and time intensive to develop. AirAsia claims that the distance between both airport runways exceeds the international standard of 2 km.
- Access - AirAsia claims that the new terminal has seamless connectivity via road and rail.
- Passenger Capacity - According to AirAsia, phase 1 of the airport will be able to handle 30 million passengers a year, and phase 2 will be able to handle 50 million per year.

AirAsia on its website claims that building a second terminal building opposite the current one, as envisioned in the KLIA master plan was not possible due to Express Rail Link powers cable height issues.

According to a local business newspaper, AirAsia enjoys incentives such as a waiver of all aeronautical charges except the Passenger Service Charge, which is borne by the passenger and expires in 2007. The incentive was given as a part of convincing AirAsia to move from Subang Airport to Kuala Lumpur International Airport. However, the incentives cover not only KLIA but all airports where AirAsia operated. The incentives cover waivers on landing, parking, aerobridge and check-in counter-charges. It is expected that AirAsia wants its own airport to help better manage airport costs.

=== Argument against building the airport ===
- The International Air Transport Association (IATA) mentioned that having a single (international) airport is the preferred way to make Kuala Lumpur an aviation hub of choice. It also indicated that by having two (international) airports would mean duplication of services such as fire and rescue, air traffic control, immigration and customs, which in turn would raise the cost of air travel. Finally, the association cited potential problems in managing air traffic as the site of the new airport at Labu is too close to KLIA.
- Aseambankers have expressed concern that the proposed new airport could also split Kuala Lumpur as a destination into separate airports, especially when passenger movements currently only total 25 million per annum, which is not huge relatively by world city standards.
- The Minority Shareholders Watchdog Group (MSWG) has questioned the need for two LCC terminals within 10 km of each other. The group queried whether any cost-benefit analysis had been done on the project, both in financial and non-financial terms. The move of building the second LCC terminal is expected to "cannibalized" the operator of the main airport as AirAsia commands significant traffic on KLIA.
- This concern has been supported by members of the public who also questioned whether there is really a justification for a third airport for KL and whether it would be for or against the "national interest". Like the MSWG, there is a general concern that the new airport may at least seriously affect the future of KLIA as Malaysia's main gateway to the world. KLIA, it has been argued, is still underutilised for an international airport, and having yet another new international airport serving Kuala Lumpur would significantly dilute the traffic at KLIA. Like IATA, air safety was another concern voiced by other parties as the two airports, KLIA and KLIA-East@Labu are so close and yet they have two separate control towers (although the safety record of AirAsia to date is good).
- There is also anxiety that the public, not the private sector, would end up having to foot the expensive bill to build and manage the highway and rail links from KLIA-East@Labu airport to Kuala Lumpur and its vicinity. If that is so, some members of the public felt this would be a waste of taxpayer's resources simply for the benefit of the private entity. However, AirAsia has said in the KLIA East website that "The government via its letter from the Economic Planning Unit (EPU) to Sime Darby has also made it abundantly clear that all infrastructure costs for this project would be borne by the project developer". As for management costs of customs and control tower, etc., AirAsia indicated they need to discuss this further and it could be similar to Senai airport, which is also private.
- In "The Malaysian Insider" news site, the majority of comments from its readers were not in favor of the airport at Labu, and were not convinced by the case put forward by the airline (AirAsia) for the new airport. Even on AirAsia's own KLIA-East microsite which is supposedly biased to strongly promote the airport project, the blog messages for the airport were split with a significant number of bloggers arguing against building the airport.
- This issue has apparently split political circles as well as Malaysian society. Even the former Prime Minister of Malaysia, Mahathir Mohamad, who is credited with masterminding the construction of the Kuala Lumpur International Airport waded in against the idea of the new airport at Labu. In his web blog site, he explained that the KLIA Masterplan has been designed to cater for future growth, up to 125 million passengers annually thus it has the expansion capacity to cater for all the future needs of AirAsia.
- Khazanah Nasional, Malaysia, the investment arm of the national government, has opposed the Sime Darby and AirAsia plans. However, critics believe that the agency is not an objective party as it is a major shareholder in Malaysia Airlines and Malaysia Airports Berhad

Malaysia Airports Berhad, the airport operator has issued a series of press statements refuting AirAsia claims on airport charges while explaining delays on the construction of a permanent LCC terminal. The airport operator mentioned that:-

- AirAsia has been growing out of the Main Terminal Building in Kuala Lumpur International Airport. The operator constructed a separate facility to enable AirAsia to achieve operational efficiency and ultimately, allow the airline to grow.
- The current LCC terminal was constructed based on AirAsia's requirements and also with a passenger growth projection of 10 million passengers annually by 2012. The terminal was also designed to cater mainly to narrow-body aircraft such as the Airbus A320 operated by AirAsia.
- Aeronautical charges are not set by the airport operator but by the government of Malaysia. According to the operator, the charges are already one of the lowest in the region and the landing fees have not been increased for 27 years.
- The operator has given a waiver for all aeronautical charges excluding Passenger Service Charge to AirAsia from 2002 to 2007 as an incentive to facilitate AirAsia's move from Subang Airport to KLIA. AirAsia requested an extension of the incentive benefits, but the operator will give out a different incentive after the approval of the airport operator restructuring exercise.

On the National Airport Master Plan study, the operator in collaboration with the Ministry of Transport and Ministry of Finance, conducted a study on the direction of future development of airports and aviation infrastructure in Malaysia.

The issue is complicated by parties (on both sides) who allegedly appear to be interested only in their own benefits. What is more, some of the interested parties are companies partly or wholly owned by the government or have links with the government. It seems less and less clear where politics come in, where decision is based on pure business, and which decision is truly in the "national interest". There has also been confusion on decisions from the Cabinet. Although it has approved the project earlier, the latest report from a local free newspaper is the Deputy Prime Minister has now said "We are studying the matter from all angles to see if the project should go ahead or if we can make some different arrangements.".

According to Singapore-based Straits Times economists and bankers have said of the debacle, "The wrangling (between the various parties) also highlights the (Malaysian) government's inability to rein in poor-performing public enterprises and pursue policies to maximise the use of resources." It also indicated "how the dominance of state-controlled agencies often stifles entrepreneurship (in Malaysia)". Analysts are calling for the Malaysian administration to referee the case (see External Links below). Air Asia is currently the largest and the most successful budget airline in the whole of Southeast Asia, pioneered by Malaysian entrepreneur Tony Fernandes. He privately bought Air Asia, then an ailing government-linked airline and turned it around as a no-frills budget airline until it was profitable and publicly listed but the public also pointed out that Air Asia receive a lot of benefits like tax waiver incentives, landing rights being fast-tracked and also being given lucrative routes that previously serviced by the government-linked Malaysia Airlines.
