= Bandar Sri Sendayan =

Township in Seremban, Negeri Sembilan, Malaysia

Coordinates: 2.6750288°N 101.8523522°E

- Suburb of Seremban
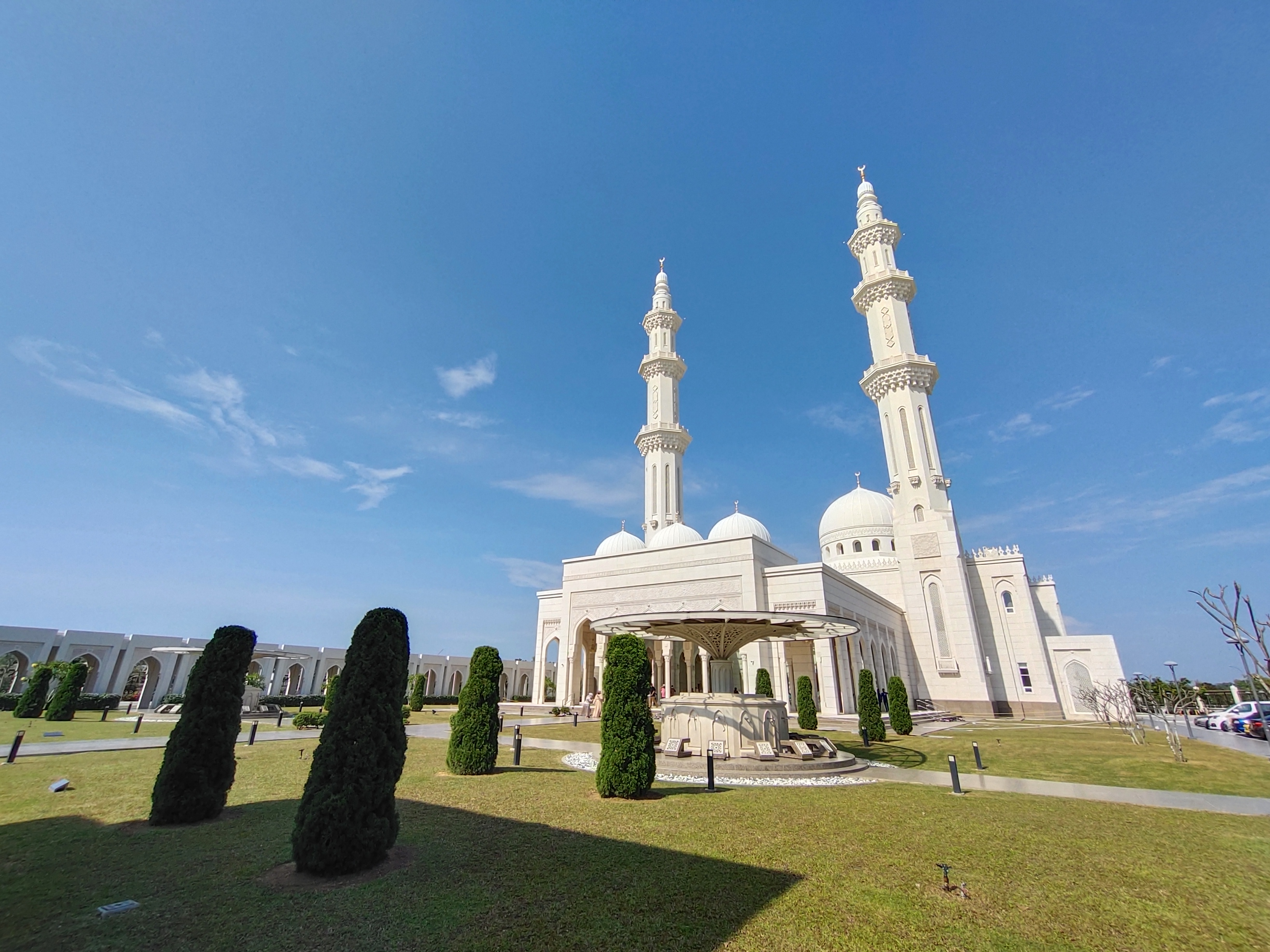
- Sri Sendayan Mosque, the largest mosque in Negeri Sembilan
- Interactive map of Bandar Sri Sendayan
- Country: Malaysia
- State: Negeri Sembilan
- Districts: Seremban and Port Dickson
- Luak: Sungai Ujong

Government
  - Body: Seremban City Council; Port Dickson Municipal Council (Bayu Sutera only)
  - Head: Masri Baharuddin (MBS); Hasnor Abdul Hamid (MPPD)
  - MP: Mohamad Hasan (BN–UMNO)
  - MLA: Mohamad Hasan (BN–UMNO)
- Elevation: 33 m (108 ft)
- Time zone: UTC+8 (Malaysia Standard Time)
  - Summer (DST): Not applicable
- Postcode: 70300; 71950
- Website: https://sendayan.com.my/about-us

Bandar Sri Sendayan is a planned township in the mukim of Labu in Seremban District, Negeri Sembilan, Malaysia. It is the western suburb within the Seremban city proper. Parts of the township also spilled beyond the district boundary into Port Dickson District, specifically in the mukim of Jimah.

Bandar Sri Sendayan is the flagship project of Matrix Concepts, and forms part of the Malaysia Vision Valley corridor.

== Background ==
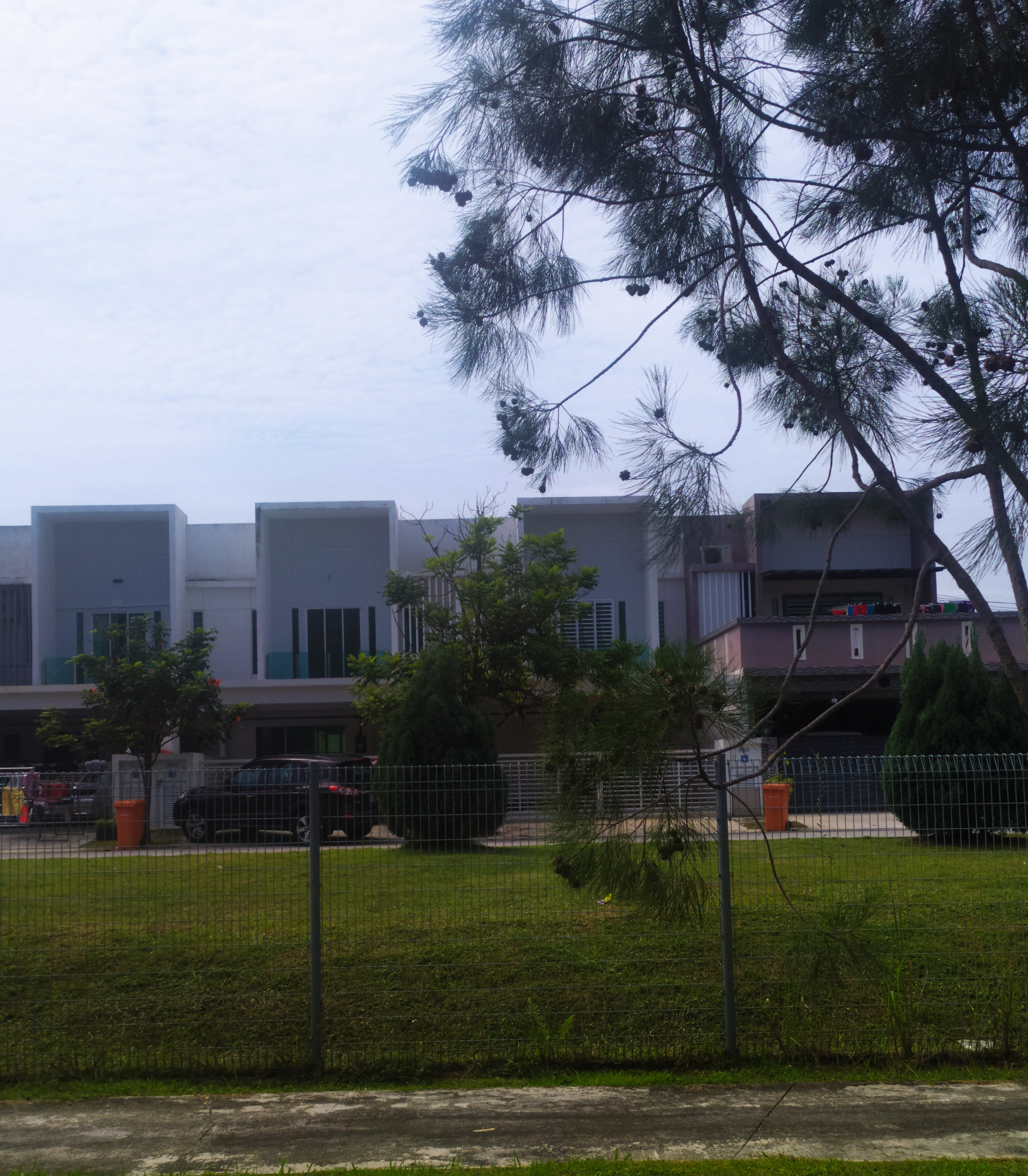
Modern terrace housing, Bandar Sri Sendayan

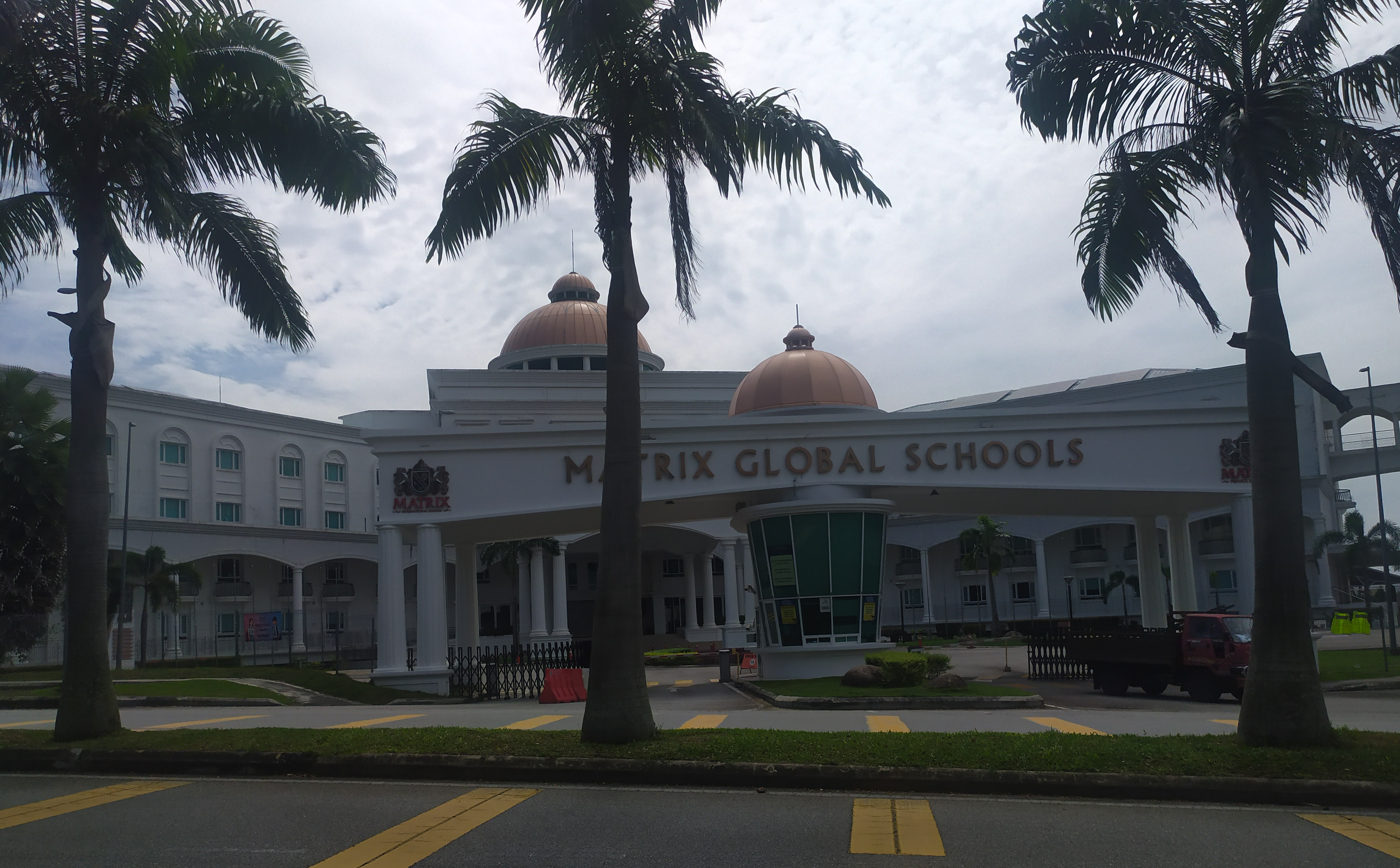
Matrix Global Schools, an international school in Bandar Sri Sendayan

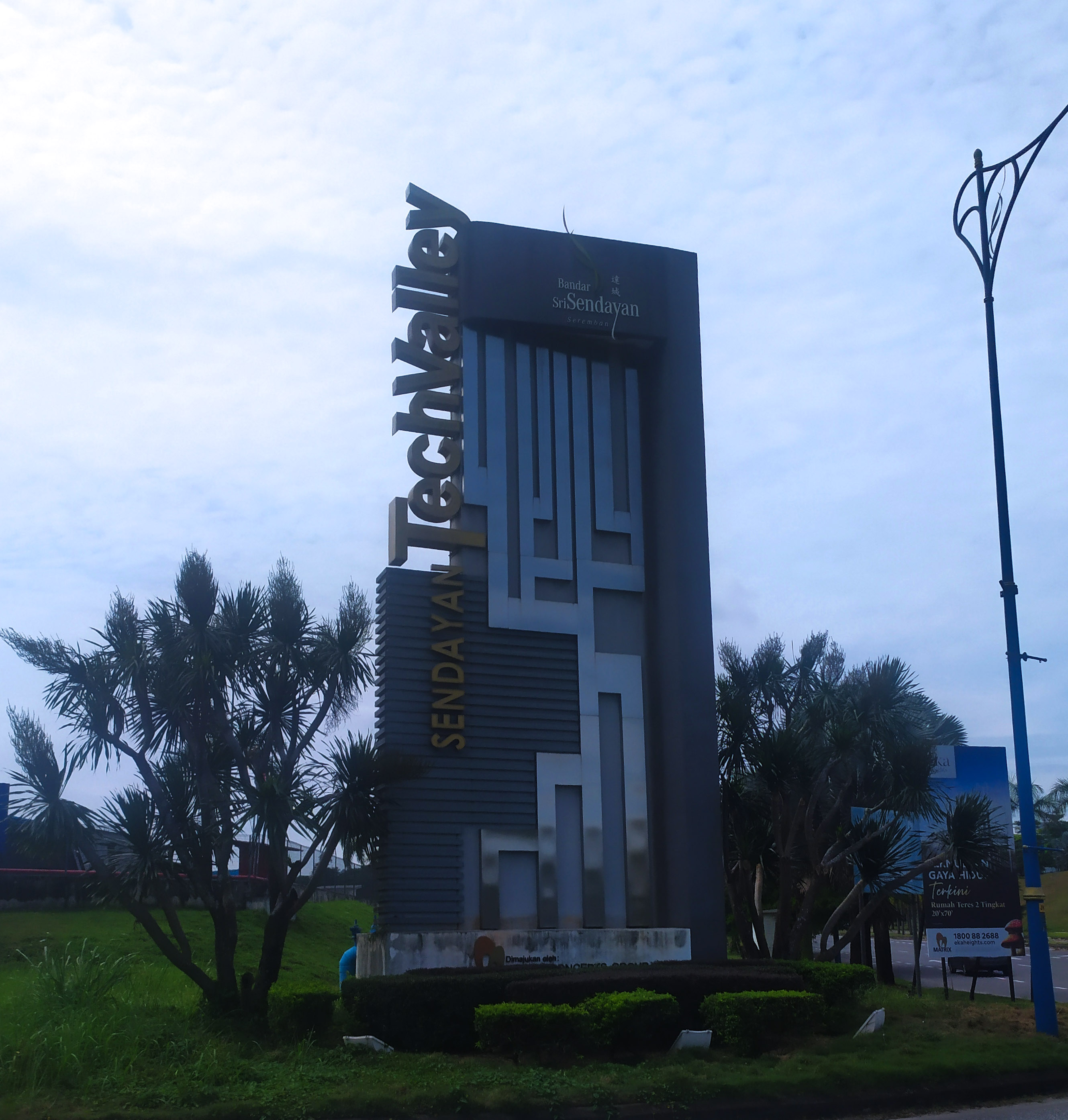
The TechValley, Bandar Sri Sendayan's industrial quarter

Bandar Sri Sendayan was previously a Federal Land Development Authority (FELDA) land scheme located on an area of 2,000 hectares (20 km^{2}) in Negeri Sembilan about 15 kilometres from Seremban. The land of this scheme was first settled in 1963 by 40 settlers, later increasing to 153. A total of 406 settlers were of Malay descent, 46 were Chinese and 61 were Indian.

In 1986, FELDA handed over the ownership of the land to the settlers and the land grant handover ceremony was officiated by the then Deputy Prime Minister, Tun Abdul Ghafar Baba. From then on, FELDA Sendayan changed its status to an ordinary village, known as Kampung Sendayan.

In 1996, in line with the ongoing economic developments, the state government through the Negeri Sembilan State Development Corporation (PKNNS) entered into a joint venture agreement with MHS Land Sdn Bhd to develop Kampung Sendayan. The settlers were offered land for purchase at a price of approximately RM1.2 million each. A sale and purchase agreement was subsequently signed on 13 November 1996.

However, by mid-1997, economic turmoil hit Southeast and East Asia. As a result, the PKNNS failed to make payments to settlers and the Sendayan crisis began. This lasted for 10 years, until it was resolved by the Menteri Besar, Dato' Seri Mohamad Hassan. On 23 February 2006, with the signing of the agreement by the Prime Minister, Dato' Seri Abdullah Ahmad Badawi, 95% of the 513 settlers received their payments.

Each settler received cash and other property worth a total of approximately RM1.2 million. This compensation is in the form of cash ranging from RM450,000 to RM685,780 per person. In addition, each person will be given 0.8 hectares (2.0 acres) of freehold agricultural land estimated to be worth RM348,480 and a four-room single-storey bungalow with a land area of 10,000 sq ft estimated to be worth RM240,000.

The area around Kampung Sendayan was later developed into a new township, known as Bandar Sri Sendayan, which is also a component of the Malaysia Vision Valley economic corridor covering the districts of Seremban and Port Dickson in western Negeri Sembilan. 21% of the development is parkland, with the remainder residential, commercial, institutional, agricultural and leisure development.

| Developer Name | Matrix Concepts Holdings Berhad |
|---|---|
| Land Tenure | Freehold |
| Development area | Over RM 5.5 Billion |
| Development Concepts | Self-Sustainable & Mix Integrated Township Development |
| Development Components | Residential & Recreational (35%) Commercial & Institutional (10%) Sendayan Techvalley (20%) TUDM Academia & Training City (14%) Orchard (21%) |
| Current population | Existing population approximately 15,000–20,000 residents |
| Total Projected Population | Estimated 120,000 upon full completion |
| Expected year of township completion | 2020 |

== Location and accessibility ==
=== Car ===
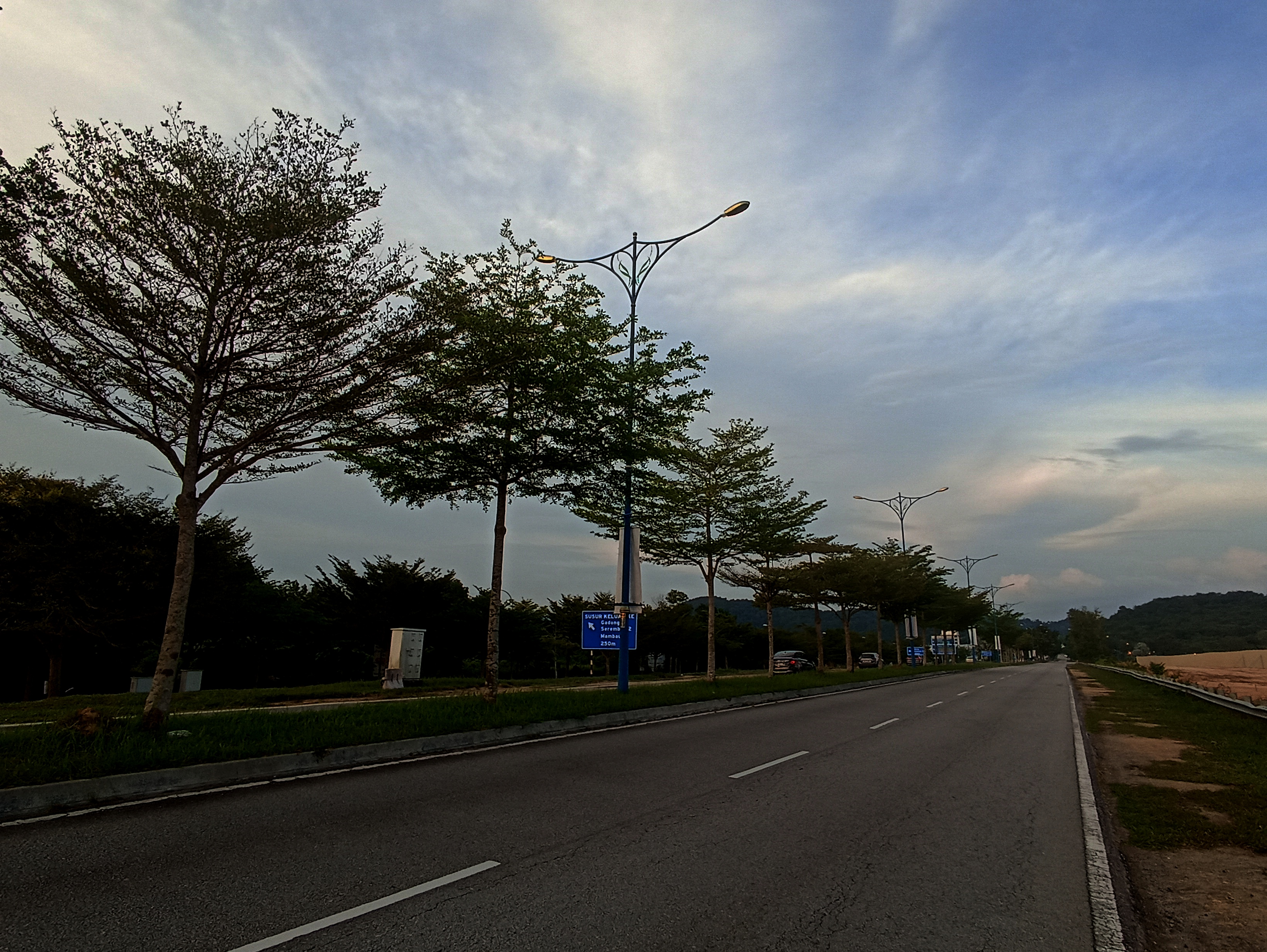
The Bandar Sri Sendayan section of FT195, eastbound towards the city centre.

Located within the borders of the Rantau state constituency, Bandar Sri Sendayan is a 20-minute drive (about 16 km [9.9 mi]) from downtown Seremban via Federal Route 195, which also connects this development to North–South Expressway Southern Route Exit 218. By road, it is about 80 km (50 mi) from Kuala Lumpur and 58 km (36 mi) from Kajang, Selangor.

Federal Route 1265 serves as a shortcut to the Federal Route 53.

=== Public transportation ===
Labu, Tiroi and Seremban stations are the closest rail stations to the development.

== Community living ==
A relatively large town park measuring at 26-acre, one of the attractions of Bandar Sri Sendayan with outdoor facilities such as badminton court, skate park, pond, amphitheatre, football field, playground, reflexology path, basketball court, fitness station, community hall, jogging track, viewing deck & tower, tai chi area, etc.

=== d'Tempat Country Club ===
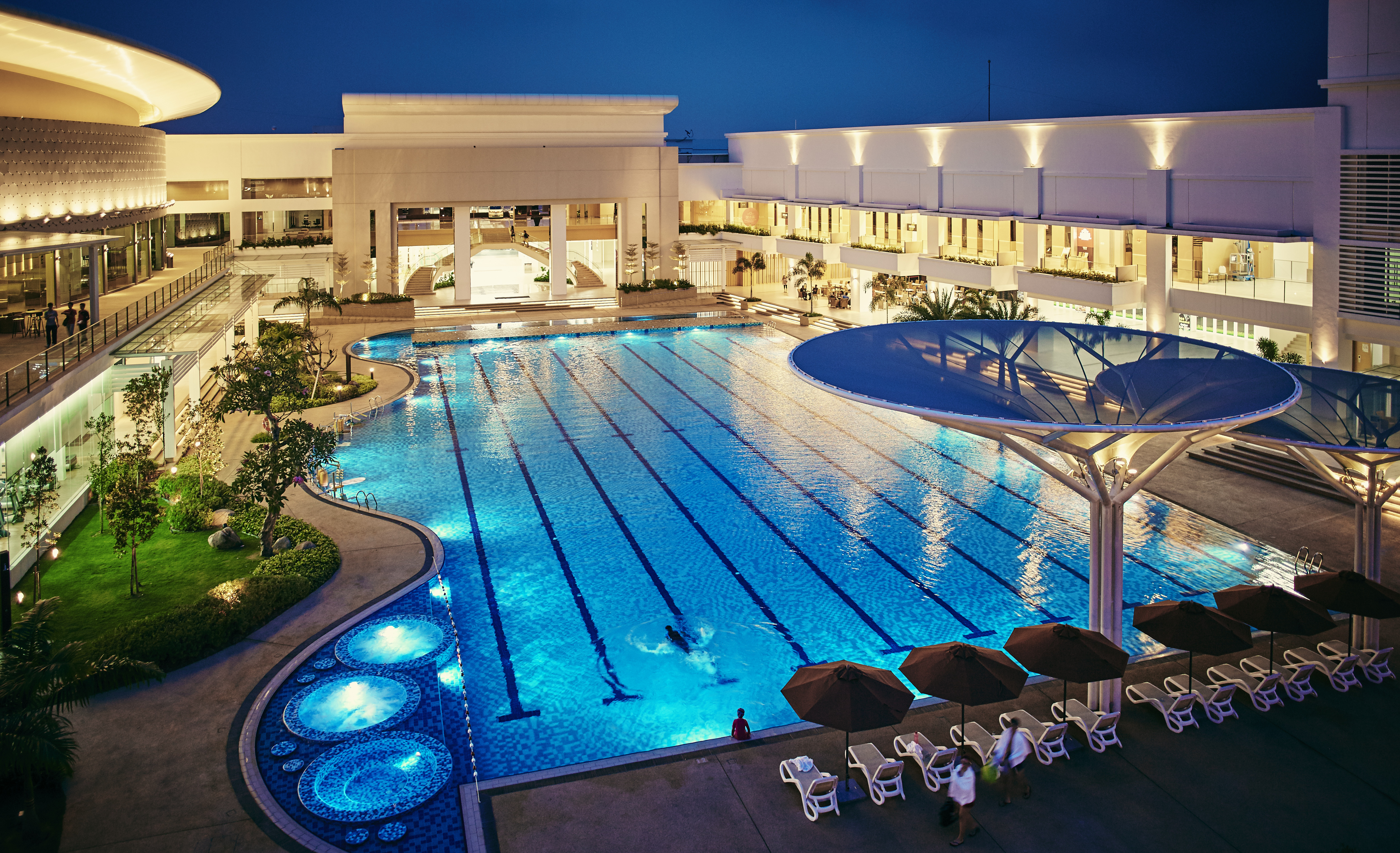
d'Tempat Country Club

d'Tempat Country club is a component of the planned township. As one of the largest clubhouse in Seremban, d'Tempat Country Club has 380,000 sq ft (35,000 m^{2}) of floor area of facilities and amenities on 6.33 acres (2.56 ha). It was built in accordance with the Malaysia Green Building Index (GBI) standards and awarded provisional Gold Certification in Design Assessment Stage under Non-Residential New Construction Category on 6 November 2013.

=== Government Funded School ===
1. SK Bandar Sri Sendayan 2. SK Sendayan 3. SMK Seri Sendayan 4. SMK Bandar Baru Sri Sendayan 5. SJK(C) Bandar Sri Sendayan 6. SJK(T) Bandar Sri Sendayan

== Future development ==
=== High-speed rail (HSR) ===
Proposed high-speed rail link between Kuala Lumpur-Singapore is revealed to have a station at Labu which is approximately 5 km (3.1 mi) away from Bandar Sri Sendayan.

=== Malaysia Vision Valley (MVV) ===
Malaysia Vision Valley (MVV) is set to be an integrated development, to be built under the Eleventh Malaysia Plan (11MP). Spanning across a proposed area of 108,000 hectares, MVV will be located in western Negeri Sembilan - covering Seremban, Nilai and Port Dickson in both Seremban and Port Dickson Districts. Poised to transform Seremban into an investor-friendly central business district and western Negeri Sembilan into a world-class metropolis, MVV is expected to generate massive investment and development in the next 30 years.

MVV mega projects will include upgrading and construction of existing and new roads. These projects will help ease the congestion in the Klang Valley, which is in line to complement the development of the Greater KL area. Currently the MVV is now in its second iteration (MVV 2.0.).

== Politics ==
Though administered as part of Seremban, Bandar Seri Sendayan actually falls within the borders of Rembau parliamentary constituency.

On the state level, Bandar Seri Sendayan falls under Rantau state constituency. Both constituencies are currently represented by former Menteri Besar of Negeri Sembilan and current Minister of Foreign Affairs, Dato' Seri Mohamad Hasan.
