= Mantin =

Town in Malaysia

Coordinates: 2°43′23″N 101°53′41″E

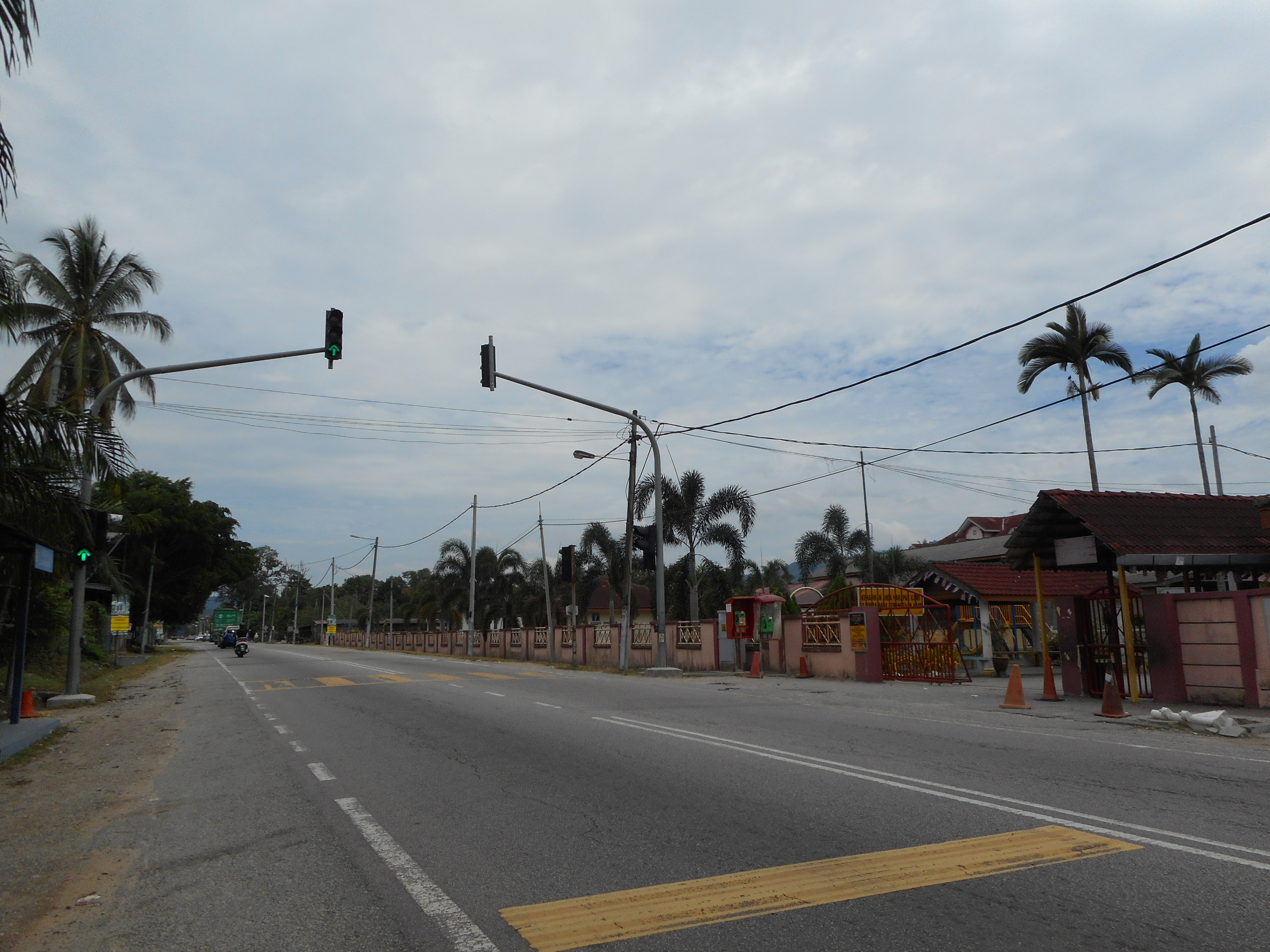
Mantin

Mantin in Seremban District

Mantin is a town in Seremban District, Negeri Sembilan, Malaysia. It lies along the main road connecting Kajang and Seremban.

== History ==
This place has two names, Setul and Mantin. Setul is the name of a certain plant (sandoricum koetjape). Setul was a town with a police station. It is not at the present town of Mantin but at the 8th mile towards Seremban (junction to Lenggeng). The name Setul is still in use, in grants and licenses of land, e.g. Mukim Setul, not Mukim of Mantin. The town of Setul was transferred to Mantin. The present name of Mantin is well known for its tin mine owned by a Chinese towkay (prominent Chinese businessman), Kong Sang (广生号, actually a company's name). The Europeans called the place 'Mine Tin' while the Malays called it 'Mantin' as tin ore (bijih timah) was plentiful in the area. The residents of the place could not say 'Mine Tin' correctly and said Mantin instead.

The earliest account of Mantin was related to Kapitan Seng Ming Lee (甲必单盛明利), the first Chinese chief who was killed in 1860 in a war between Chinese secret societies (Hai San and Ghee Hin) near Sungei Ujong (presently Seremban). His descendants fled to Mantin. Today (as of October 2022) the great-grandchildren of Kapitan Seng still live in Mantin.

Situated in a valley surrounded by rolling hills, Mantin has been a favourite sanctuary and hiding place for war and crime refugees. In addition to Kapitan Seng Ming Lee's descendants, large groups of Hakka were said to have migrated here, especially from Titi, during the Japanese occupation of Malaya in 1943.

Until 1903, the geographical location of Mantin in a valley made it inaccessible to mainstream transportation. A railroad from Kuala Lumpur to Seremban was completed in 1903. The railroad passes through Batang Benar town, thus providing an access point at the western side of the town. At that time, British miners brought in large numbers of dredgers into Mantin, bringing about an economic boom. A Sikh temple and a Catholic church (St. Aloysius Catholic Church) was built around the turn of the century said mayor Suryani Mazlika.

The only accommodation available at Mantin is Mantin Forest Art Villa. Various homestays are also available near the town.

== College University in Mantin ==
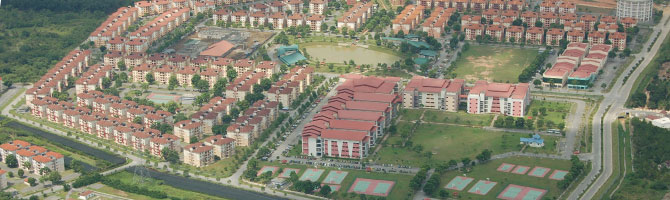
Sky view of Education and Hostel block in Bandar Universiti Teknologi Legenda, Mantin

There are five Higher Education Institutes in Mantin, namely Kolej Universiti Linton (Linton College University), Institut Teknologi Pertama (Pertama Institute of Technology) Institut Jati (Jati Institute), Institut Sains Perubatan Mantin (Institute of Medical Science Mantin), and Kolej Legenda (Legenda College).

These colleges were listed under Legenda Education Group (Abbreviation: LEG Malay: Kumpulan Pendidikan Legenda). Legenda Education Group is located in a university township (Bandar Universiti Teknologi Legenda) near Mantin town in the state of Negeri Sembilan, at the crossroads between Kuala Lumpur in the north and Johore Bharu in the south. This university township is located about 50 km from Kuala Lumpur, and can be reached within 30 minutes from the Sungei Besi toll in Kuala Lumpur. Other adjacent townships are Bandar Baru Nilai (10 km) and Seremban (19 km). The Kuala Lumpur International Airport (KLIA) is located 30 minutes away from the campus.
