= Labu Komuter station =

Railway station in Labu, Negeri Sembilan, Malaysia

Labu

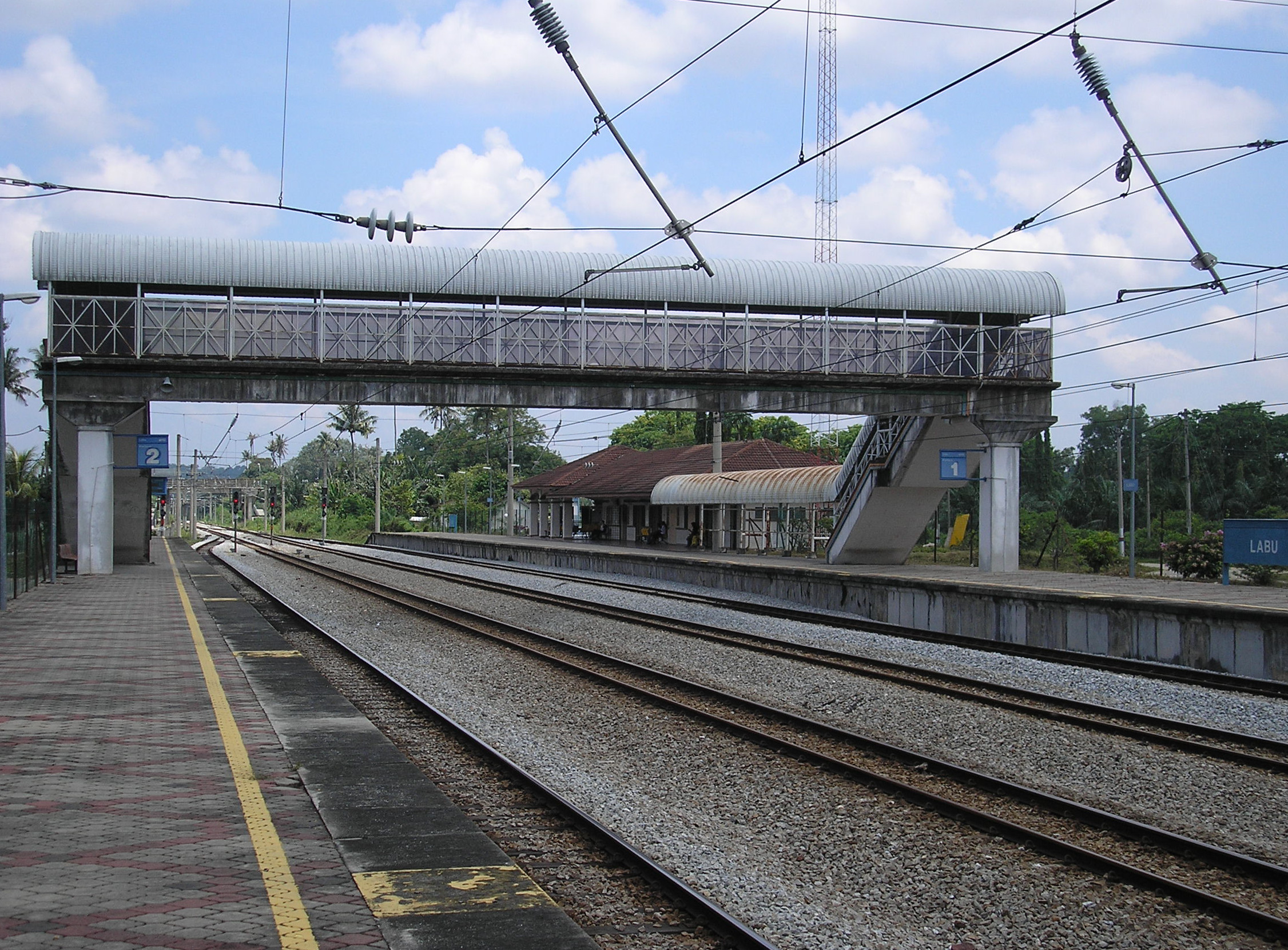
- A platform view of the Labu station, as seen northbound.

General information
- Other names: Malay: لابو (Jawi); Chinese: 拉务; Tamil: லாபு
- Location: Labu, Negeri Sembilan, Malaysia.
- Coordinates: 2°45′14″N 101°49′36″E
- System: KB11 | Commuter rail station
- Owner: Railway Assets Corporation
- Operator: Keretapi Tanah Melayu
- Line: West Coast Line
- Platforms: 2 side platforms
- Tracks: 4

Construction
- Structure type: At-grade
- Parking: Available
- Accessible: No

Other information
- Station code: KB11

History
- Opened: 1903
- Rebuilt: 1995
- Electrified: 1995

Services
Preceding station	Keretapi Tanah Melayu (Komuter)	Following station
Nilai towards Batu Caves	Batu Caves–Pulau Sebang Line	Tiroi towards Pulau Sebang/Tampin
Location

Labu Komuter station (formerly Labu railway station) is a KTM Komuter train station located at and named after the small town of Labu, Negeri Sembilan.

Located between a village and a large palm oil estate, the station previously served KTM Intercity train services from 1903 to 1995 and now is served by the Seremban Line KTM Komuter train services, but located along a four-lane railway (two acceptance routes at both ends and two basic routes in the middle), the station is also in charge of managing railway switches and supports a small railway staff. The station, like many stations of lesser importance along the KTM Komuter lines, has only two platforms for northbound or southbound passengers.

== See also ==
- Rail transport in Malaysia
