= Labu, Negeri Sembilan =

Coordinates: 2°45′N 101°49′E

Labu
- Mukim
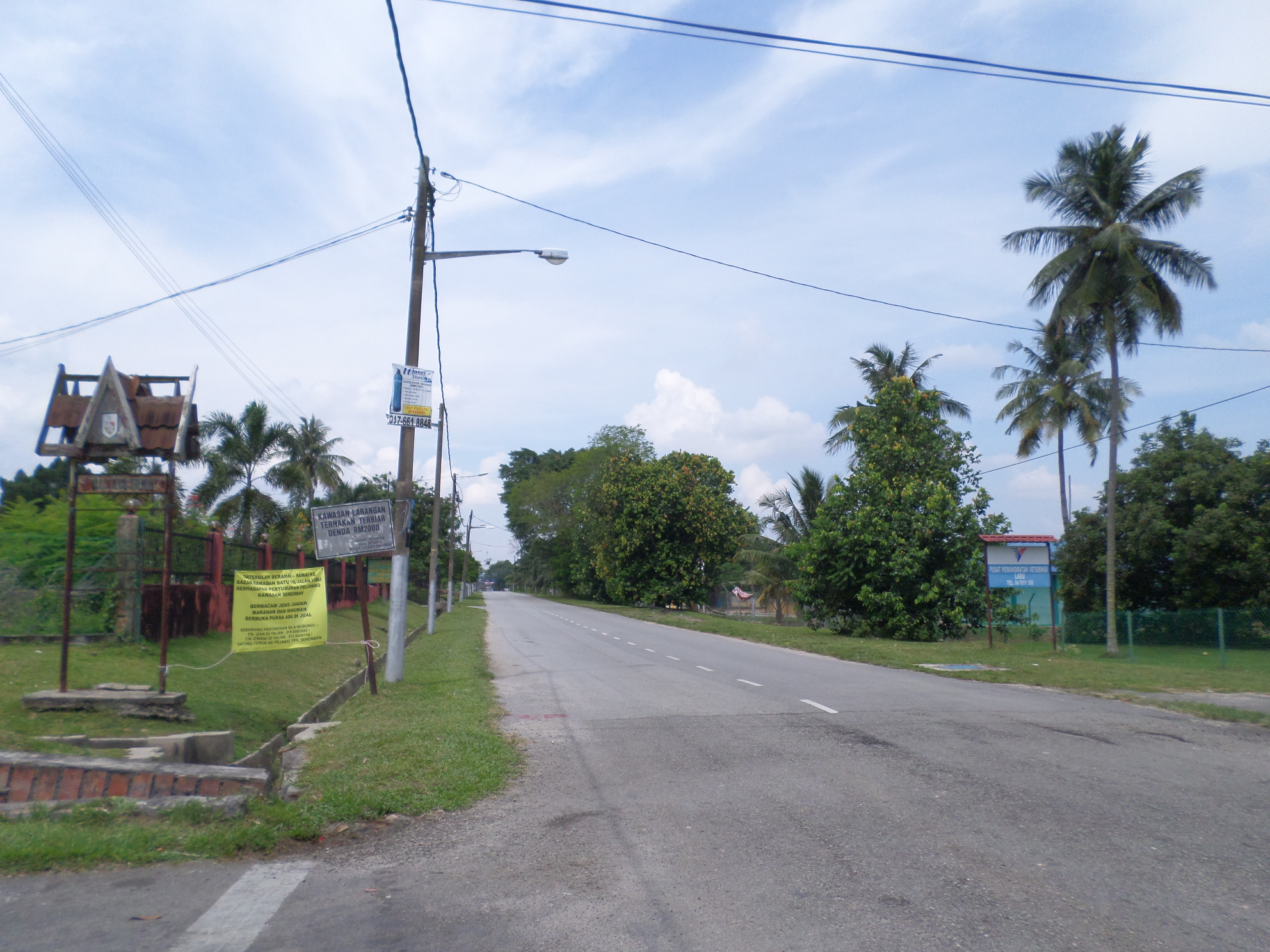

- Labu in Seremban District
- Country: Malaysia
- State: Negeri Sembilan
- District: Seremban
- Luak: Sungai Ujong

Government
  - Body: Seremban City Council
  - Mayor: Masri Baharuddin
  - MP: Cha Kee Chin (PH–DAP)
  - MLA: Siti Nur Umaira Hasim (BN–UMNO)
  - Summer (DST): UTC+8 (MST)
- Postcode: 71900

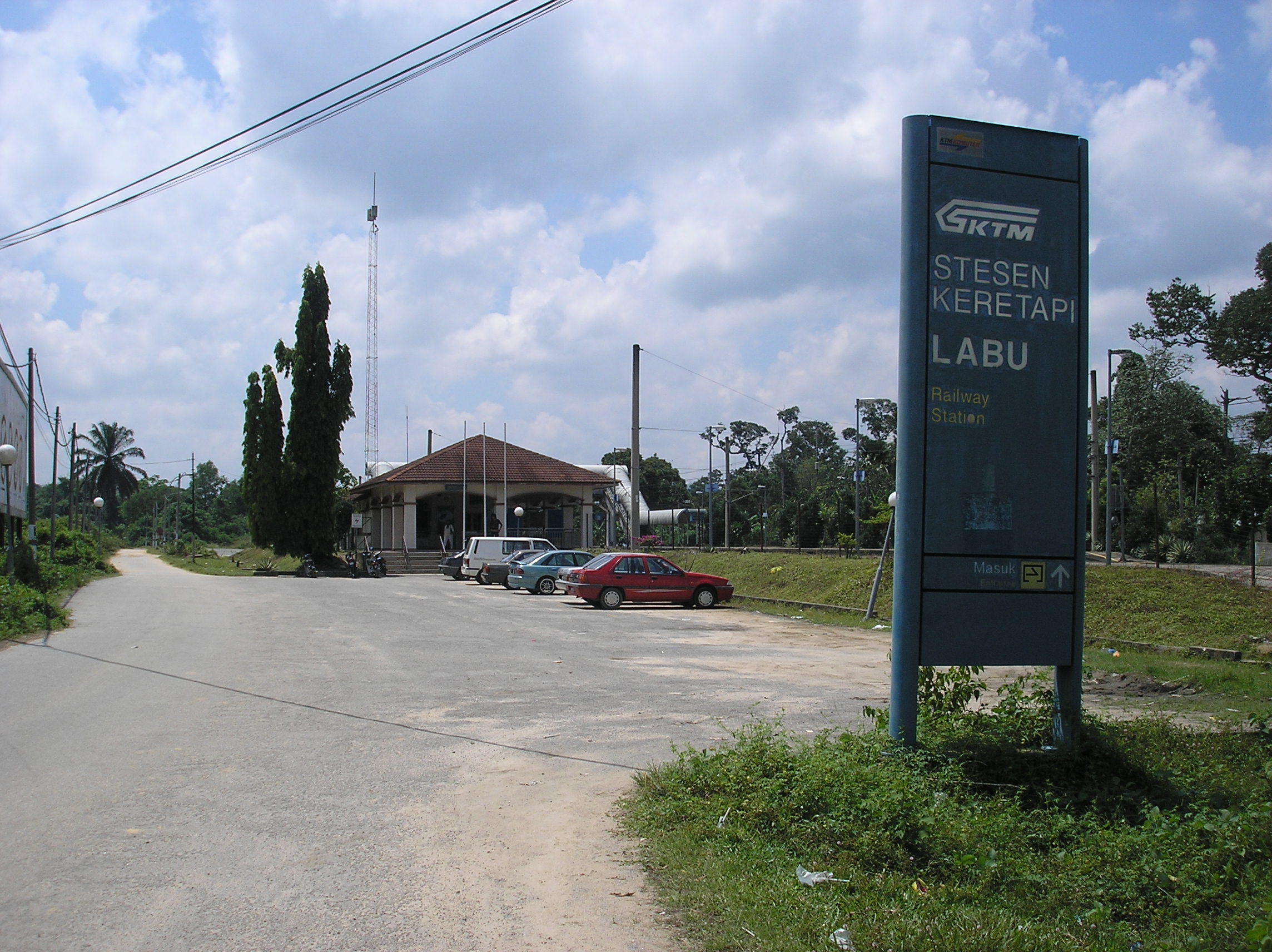
The Labu station (Seremban Line), as seen from its main entrance.

Labu is a mukim in Seremban District, Negeri Sembilan, Malaysia.

== Etymology ==
Labu is the Malay word for "pumpkin".

== Geography ==
Nearby towns include Tiroi, Pelegong, Gadong, Kondok, and Jijan. Labu also known as the 'Motherland of the Datuk Syahbandar of Sungai Ujong' (Malay: Telapak Datuk Syahbandar Sungai Ujong).

== Transportation ==
Jalan Labu Federal Route 362 is the backbone of Labu and Tiroi which serves these towns to Nilai and Seremban. Labu is not directly served by the North-South Expressway, although Labu is not too far from the Bandar Ainsdale exit, at only 10 km away. Labu is also served by the KTM Komuter Seremban Line. The Labu Komuter station has no proper tar road to this station, and its road has been broken without repairs for the past few years.

== Economy ==
The township used to be remain underdeveloped, resulting in migration to nearby settlements due to poor opportunities, due to neglect from the town's YB man. Most locals work in the government sector, and some others work in agriculture and farming livestock. However, the Labu town now been developed under new assemblyman, YB Datuk Hasim B. Rusdi. Part of the Malaysia Vision Valley corridor, Labu has experienced an urbanisation boom as nearby new townships like Bandar Sri Sendayan, Bandar Ainsdale and Bandar Enstek are currently being developed. There were two megaprojects being proposed in Labu, such as the KLIA East, a low-cost carrier terminal set to replace the original LCCT (now replaced with KLIA2 within the main airport's vicinity), and the Seremban station of the Kuala Lumpur-Singapore high-speed rail (scrapped as of now, pending possible revival). Dari sudut ekonomi, DUN N.20 LABU sedang berkembang hasil limpahan pembangunan koridor Malaysia Vision Valley (MVV 2.0), namun masih terdapat beberapa isu yang menjadi rungutan penduduk dan sesuai dijadikan dapatan laporan.

== See also ==
- KLIA East @ Labu
- Sekolah Menengah Agama Persekutuan Labu
