= Seremban District =

Seremban District Somban (Negeri Sembilan Malay)
- District of Negeri Sembilan
- Daerah Seremban
- Location of Seremban District in Negeri Sembilan
- Interactive map of Seremban District
- Location of Seremban District in Malaysia
- Coordinates: 2°45′N 101°55′E
- Country: Malaysia
- State: Negeri Sembilan
- Seat: Seremban
- Local area government(s): Seremban City Council

Government
  - District officer: Mohamad Najib Mustafa

Area
  - Total: 935.02 km^{2} (361.01 sq mi)

Population (2020)
  - Total: 692,283
  - Density: 726/km^{2} (1,880/sq mi)
- Time zone: UTC+8 (MST)
  - Summer (DST): UTC+8 (Not observed)
- Postcode: 70xxx
- Calling code: +6-06
- Vehicle registration plates: N

The Seremban District (Negeri Sembilan Malay: Somban) is one of the seven districts in Negeri Sembilan, Malaysia. This is where the capital of Negeri Sembilan, Seremban is located.

Seremban District shares a border with Sepang and Hulu Langat Districts, Selangor to the north, Jelebu District to the northeast, Kuala Pilah District to the east, Port Dickson District to the west, and Rembau District to the south.

== Government ==
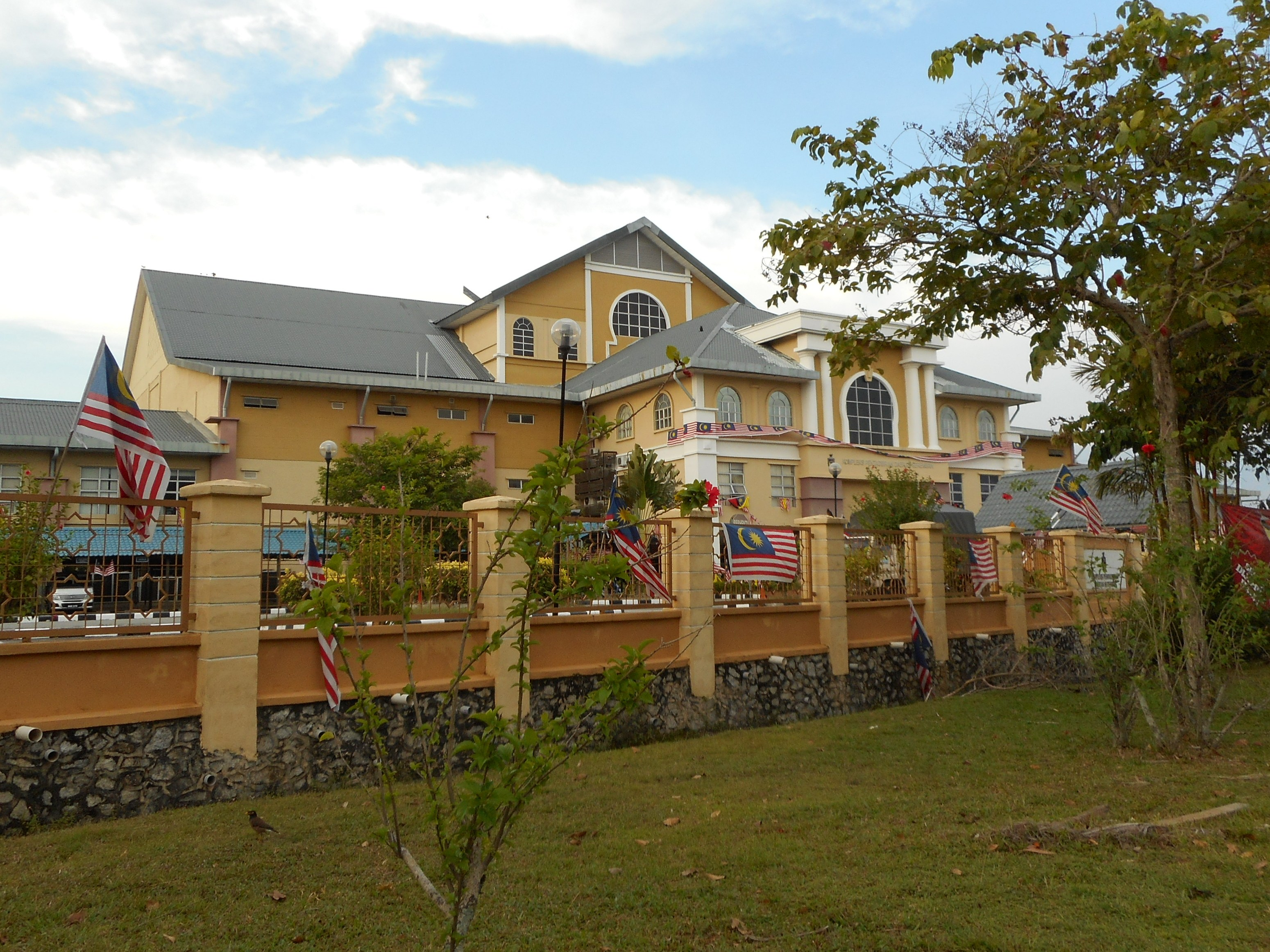
Seremban District and Land Office

The newly formed Seremban City Council cover the whole Seremban district. The formation of Seremban City Council was done via the merging of Seremban Municipal Council and Nilai Municipal Council on 1 January 2020.

== Administrative divisions ==

Seremban District is divided into 8 mukims, which are:

- Ampangan
- Labu
- Lenggeng
- Pantai
- Rasah
- Rantau
- Seremban City
- Setul

This district has 3 parliament districts which is Seremban (North, 6 seat) Rasah (South, 5 seat) and Rembau (Paroi and Rantau).

== City areas ==
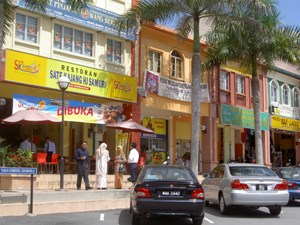
Senawang Commercial Centre, Senawang

=== Inner Seremban (Seremban city core) ===
- Seremban
- Rasah
- Rasah Jaya
- Rahang
- Mambau
- Senawang
- Temiang
- Lobak
- Paroi
- Bukit Chedang
- Bukit Blossom
- Seremban 2
- Ampangan
- Oakland
- Bukit Kepayang
- Kemayan
- Sikamat
- Bandar Sri Sendayan
- Taman Permai

=== Outer Seremban ===
- Bandar Baru Nilai
- Rantau
- Mantin
- Sungai Gadut
- Labu
- Lenggeng
- Taman Seremban Jaya
- Bandar Seremban Selatan
- Taman Tuanku Jaafar
- Rasah Kemayan
- Pantai
- Ulu Beranang
- Pajam

=== Seremban 2 ===
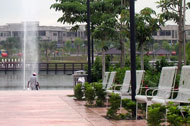
Seremban 2 City Park

Seremban 2 is a new satellite township about 4 kilometres south-east of the existing old Seremban citt centre. Located on the western side of the North–South Expressway, Seremban 2 is a planned township built on former oil palm estate land. Seremban 2's purpose was to relocate the administrative and business district from the crowded old city centre to a more organised area.

Spanning over 2,000 acres (8 km^{2}) of land, Seremban 2 will be the site of the new

- Seremban District administrative offices
- Seremban Court Complex.
- District Police headquarters
- State Fire Brigade headquarters

The RM2 billion township will also sustain a large portion of the population of Seremban through various housing estate projects in and around Seremban 2 such as

- Green Street Homes
- Sri Carcosa
- Central Park
- Emerald Park
- Garden Homes
- Garden Avenue
- Garden City Homes
- Vision Homes
- S2 Heights
- Park Avenue

The residents here enjoy many facilities with ÆON Seremban 2 Shopping Centre, City Park, Seremban 2's Lake Gardens and less traffic than the town centre.

== Demographics ==
Historical population
Year	Pop.	±%
1991	263,383	—
2000	383,530	+45.6%
2010	536,147	+39.8%
2020	692,407	+29.1%

== Cuisine ==
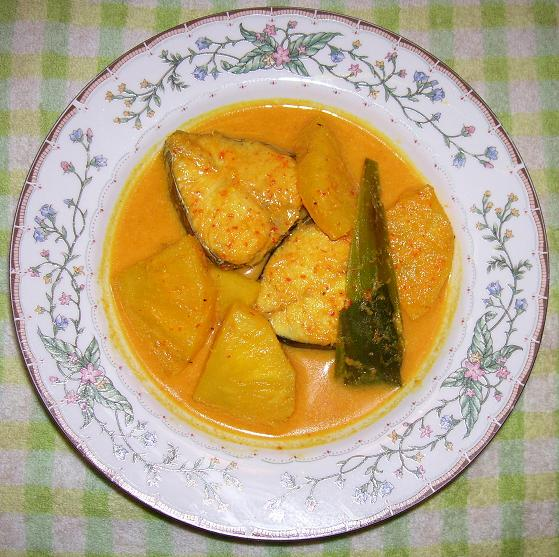
Gulai lemak cili padi

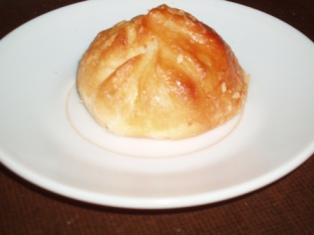
Seremban Siew Pau

Seremban is famous for its special delicacies comprising Malay, Chinese, Indian cuisine.

- Lemak cili padi. Seremban is also famous for its masak lemak cili padi or called gulai lemak cili api, a traditional Negeri Sembilan hot dish.
- Siew pau. It is a type of baked bun with flaky pastry bun and meat (usually pork) filling.
- Beef noodles. This beef noodles are the best here in Seremban, and the best beef noodles which can be found in Seremban is located at the main Seremban market in town (Pasar Besar Seremban).
- ABC or air batu campur meaning shaved ice with brown sugar syrup and rose flavouring, corn, beans, and cendol.
- Traditional mutton soup
- Seremban Laksa

== Federal Parliament and State Assembly Seats ==
List of Seremban district representatives in the Federal Parliament (Dewan Rakyat)

Parliament	Seat Name	Member of Parliament	Party
P128	Seremban	Anthony Loke Siew Fook	Pakatan Harapan (DAP)
P130	Rasah	Cha Kee Chin	Pakatan Harapan (DAP)
P131	Rembau	Mohamad Hasan	Barisan Nasional (UMNO)

List of Seremban district representatives in the State Legislative Assembly

Parliament	State	Seat Name	State Assemblyman	Party
P128	N9	Lenggeng	Mohd Asna Amin	Barisan Nasional (UMNO)
P128	N10	Nilai	Arul Kumar Jambunathan	Pakatan Harapan (DAP)
P128	N11	Lobak	Chew Seh Yong	Pakatan Harapan (DAP)
P128	N12	Temiang	Ho Weng Wah	Pakatan Harapan (DAP)
P128	N13	Sikamat	Razali Abu Samah	Perikatan Nasional (WAWASAN)
P128	N14	Ampangan	Mohamad Rafie Abdul Malek	Perikatan Nasional (PAS)
P130	N20	Labu	Siti Nur Umaira Hasim	Barisan Nasional (UMNO)
P130	N21	Bukit Kepayang	Nicole Tan Lee Koon	Pakatan Harapan (DAP)
P130	N22	Rahang	Siau Meow Kong	Pakatan Harapan (DAP)
P130	N23	Mambau	Lee Kai Yet	Pakatan Harapan (DAP)
P130	N24	Seremban Jaya	Mugunthan Subramaniam	Pakatan Harapan (DAP)
P131	N25	Paroi	Kamarol Ridzuan Mohd Zain	Perikatan Nasional (PAS)
P131	N27	Rantau	Mohamad Hasan	Barisan Nasional (UMNO)

== Climate ==
Climate data for Seremban
Month	Jan	Feb	Mar	Apr	May	Jun	Jul	Aug	Sep	Oct	Nov	Dec	Year
Mean daily maximum °C (°F)	30.9 (87.6)	31.7 (89.1)	32.5 (90.5)	32.2 (90.0)	31.7 (89.1)	31.3 (88.3)	31.1 (88.0)	30.9 (87.6)	31.2 (88.2)	31.2 (88.2)	31.0 (87.8)	31.0 (87.8)	31.4 (88.5)
Daily mean °C (°F)	26.6 (79.9)	27.2 (81.0)	27.7 (81.9)	27.8 (82.0)	27.5 (81.5)	27.1 (80.8)	26.9 (80.4)	26.8 (80.2)	26.9 (80.4)	27.0 (80.6)	26.9 (80.4)	26.8 (80.2)	27.1 (80.8)
Mean daily minimum °C (°F)	22.3 (72.1)	22.7 (72.9)	22.9 (73.2)	23.4 (74.1)	23.4 (74.1)	23.0 (73.4)	22.7 (72.9)	22.8 (73.0)	22.7 (72.9)	22.8 (73.0)	22.9 (73.2)	22.6 (72.7)	22.9 (73.1)
Average precipitation mm (inches)	114 (4.5)	110 (4.3)	178 (7.0)	232 (9.1)	180 (7.1)	119 (4.7)	127 (5.0)	143 (5.6)	158 (6.2)	237 (9.3)	252 (9.9)	193 (7.6)	2,043 (80.3)
Source: Climate-Data.org

== See also ==
- Districts of Malaysia
