= Malaysia Federal Route 366 =

Road in Malaysia

Federal Route 366
- Temiang–Pantai Highway

Route information
- Maintained by Malaysian Public Works Department
- Length: 7.44 km (4.62 mi)
- History: Opened in 2021

Major junctions
- West end: Temiang
- Kajang–Seremban Highway; FT 86 Federal Route 86
- East end: Pantai

Location
- Country: Malaysia
- Primary destinations: Pantai, Temiang, Seremban, Ampangan, Kuala Klawang

Highway system
- Highways in Malaysia; Expressways; Federal; State

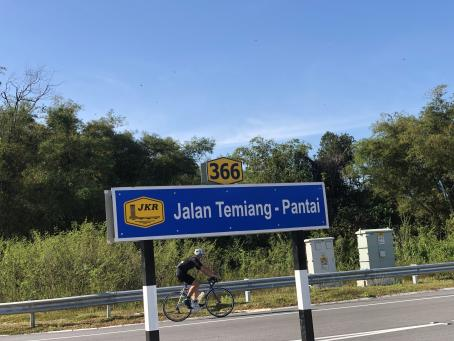
Jalan Temiang-Pantai name sign

Federal Route 366, Temiang–Pantai Highway (Malay: Jalan Temiang–Pantai / Jalan Pintas Temiang) is a federal route in Seremban, Negeri Sembilan, Malaysia. It is built to shorten amount of time for users from Kajang–Seremban Highway to Malaysia Federal Route 86 which connects Seremban to Kuala Klawang and Simpang Pertang.

== Route description and Overview ==
The kilometre zero of this road is located at Temiang, at its interchange with E21 Kajang–Seremban Highway at the Ulu Temiang Interchange. The road has four lanes, dual carriageway from Ulu Temiang Interchange until Temiang roundabout and two lanes, single carriageway (super two) for the rest of the road until Pantai junction.

== History ==
=== Construction and cost ===
The construction of the road began in 2019 and was completed on 23 July 2021, 17 days earlier than its expected completion. The road was opened to traffic on 26 August 2021. Construction of the road costs about RM180 million.

=== Scenic view along road ===
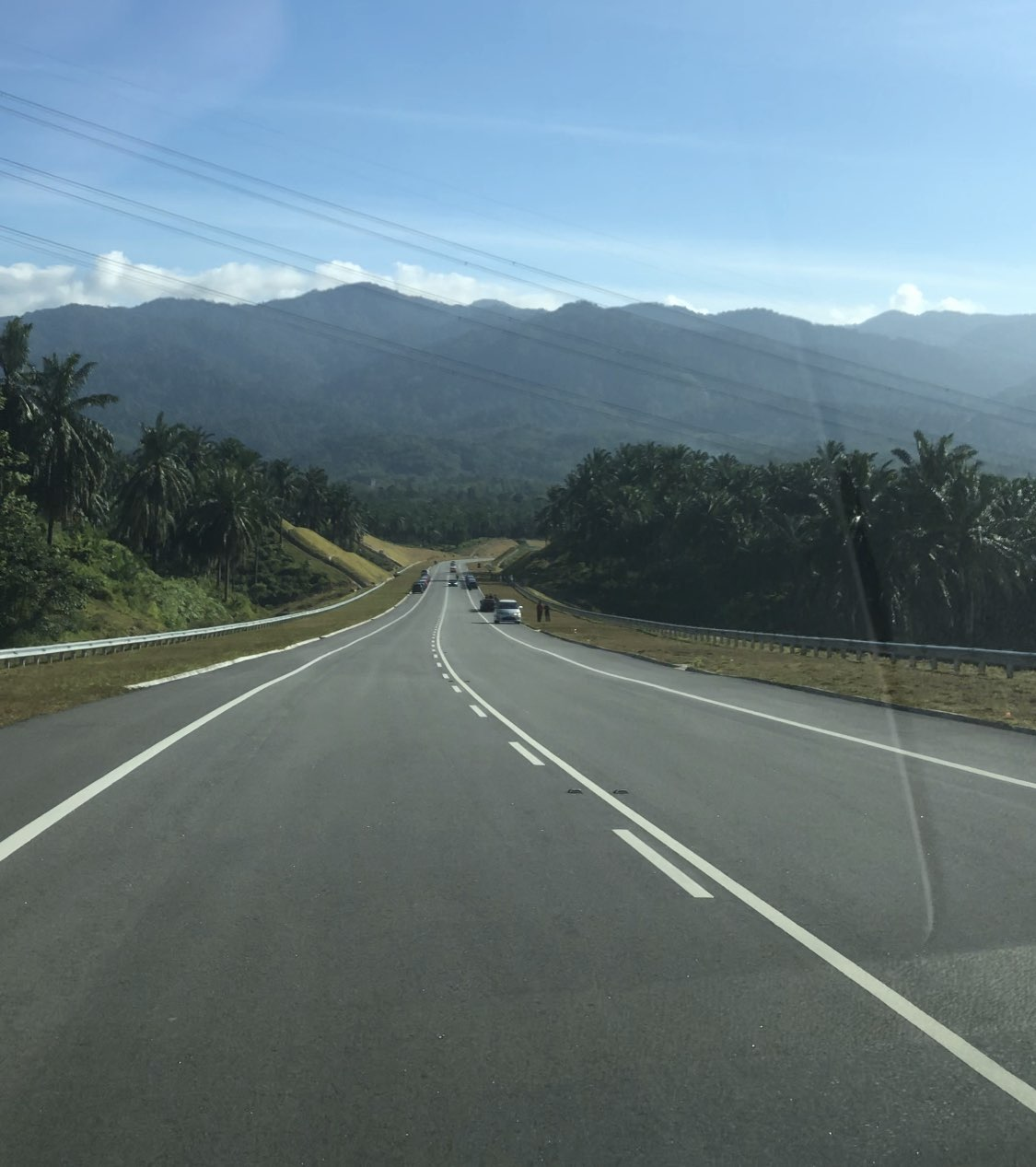
Scenic view along FT366

The road is known for its scenic view of the Titiwangsa Mountains, the longest mountain range in Malaysia. Locals describe it having a "New Zealand-esque view".

== Features ==
- At most sections, the Federal Route 366 was built under the JKR R5 road standard, allowing maximum speed limit of up to 90 km/h. (Super two road)
- Wide roadside medians and emergency lanes
- 2 roundabouts, one at-grade and another one is below elevated main route
- Scenic view of the Titiwangsa Mountains along the road

== Controversy ==
In January 2022, a car group posted a picture of their gathering which the cars are parked along the roads emergency lane. This results in mixed reactions from people as the road was usually full of cars stopping on the roadside and emergency lanes which is very hazardous.

Starting from February 2022, the road will be constantly patrolled by Seremban police and JPJ that will not allow and issue fines to any vehicle that stop along the road except for emergencies.

Plans to build a rest stop/vista point for road users to stop by safely are still in the works.

On 22 May 2022, a Malaysian artiste, Baby Shima made a TikTok video at the emergency lane which is against the Malaysian road laws.

The Director of Department of Road Transport (JPJ) in the state of Negeri Sembilan, Hanif Yusabra Yusof said, the action of a driver who stops in the emergency lane of the roadway without reasonable excuse is an offense.

However, people who want to take pictures on the road is not an offence if they do not park on the shoulder of the road and emergency lanes for the purpose of taking pictures and gathering.

== Junctions lists ==
The entire route is located in Seremban District, Negeri Sembilan.

Legend:

- I/C - Interchange, I/S - Intersection, RSA - Rest and service area, OBR - Overhead bridge restaurant, R/R - Restaurant and rest plaza, L/B - Layby, V/P - Vista point, TN - tunnel, T/P - Toll plaza, BR - Bridge
- C - Cloverleaf, S - Stack, T-A - Trumpet-A, T-B - Trumpet-B, DT - Directional-T/Y, SDT - Semi-Directional-T/Y, P-Y - Partial-Y, D - Diamond, P-C - Partial cloverleaf, D-D - Diverging diamond, D-R - Direct ramp

Location	km	mi	Exit	Name	Destinations	Notes
Temiang	7.44	4.62		Pantai I/S	FT 86 Malaysia Federal Route 86 – Kuala Klawang, Simpang Pertang, Simpang Durian, Pantai, Ampangan, Seremban	T-shaped junction
Temiang	7.34	4.56	Sungai Linggi Bridge			
Temiang	4.20	2.61		Temiang I/S	FT 86 Malaysia Federal Route 86 – Kuala Klawang, Simpang Pertang, Simpang Durian, Pantai, Ampangan, Seremban	Roundabout
Temiang	1.50	0.93		Taman Bukit Mutiara I/S	Lorong Bukit Mutiara 21/1 – Taman Bukit Mutiara	4-way junctions
Temiang	1.10	0.68		Desa Temiang	Persiaran Desa Temiang	Entrance/exit only from/to eastbound
Temiang	0.32	0.20		Desa Temiang I/C	Persiaran Desa Temiang – Taman Desa Temiang; Jalan Temiang – Temiang, Taman Temiang Jaya, Taman Bukit Coral	Stacked roundabout interchange
Temiang	0.00	0.00	2105A	Temiang I/C	Kajang–Seremban Highway – Kajang, Serdang, Cheras, Ulu Klang, Hulu Langat , Kuala Lumpur, Seremban, Ampangan, Malacca, Johor Bahru Melaka, Kuala Pilah, Seri Menanti, Bahau, Senawang	Stacked interchange
1.000 mi = 1.609 km; 1.000 km = 0.621 mi: Incomplete access

== See also ==
- Kajang–Seremban Highway
- Malaysia Federal Route 86
- Seremban
