= Negeri Sembilan State Route N101 =

Road in Malaysia

Negeri Sembilan Route 101
- Jalan Tok Dagang

Major junctions
- North end: Ampangan
- FT 86 Federal Route 86; FT 51 Federal Route 51
- South end: Paroi

Location
- Country: Malaysia
- Primary destinations: Kuala Klawang, Paroi, Kuala Pilah

Highway system
- Highways in Malaysia; Expressways; Federal; State

Jalan Tok Dagang, Negeri Sembilan State Route N101 is a major road in Negeri Sembilan, Malaysia. It serves most of the neighbourhoods in Ampangan and Paroi.

== Junction lists ==
The entire route is located in Seremban District, Negeri Sembilan.

Legend:

- I/C - Interchange, I/S - Intersection, RSA - Rest and service area, OBR - Overhead bridge restaurant, R/R - Restaurant and rest plaza, L/B - Layby, V/P - Vista point, TN - tunnel, T/P - Toll plaza, BR - Bridge
- C - Cloverleaf, S - Stack, T-A - Trumpet-A, T-B - Trumpet-B, DT - Directional-T/Y, SDT - Semi-Directional-T/Y, P-Y - Partial-Y, D - Diamond, P-C - Partial cloverleaf, D-D - Diverging diamond, D-R - Direct ramp

Location	km	Name	Destinations	Notes
Ampangan		Jalan Jelebu	FT 86 Federal Route 86 – Seremban town centre, Kuala Klawang; Kajang–Seremban Highway – Kuala Lumpur, Kajang, Paroi	T-junctions
Ampangan		Taman PJ Perdana	Persiaran Palma Jaya – Taman PJ Perdana, Palma Jaya Perdana, Seremban International Golf Club	T-junctions
Ampangan		Taman Panchor Jaya	Persiaran Semarak 1 – Taman Panchor Jaya	T-junctions
Paroi		Taman Paroi Jaya	Persiaran Rajawali – Taman Paroi Jaya, Taman Pinggiran Golf, Paroi Sports Complex, Tuanku Abdul Rahman Paroi Stadium	T-junctions
Paroi		Kampung Tok Dagang		
Paroi		Taman Cengal Utama		
Paroi		Paroi	FT 51 Federal Route 51 – Seremban town centre, Senawang, Sri Menanti, Kuala Pilah; North–South Expressway Southern Route / AH2 – Kuala Lumpur, Johor Bahru	T-junctions
1.000 mi = 1.609 km; 1.000 km = 0.621 mi
