= Jalan Semenyih–Kuala Klawang =

Road in Malaysia

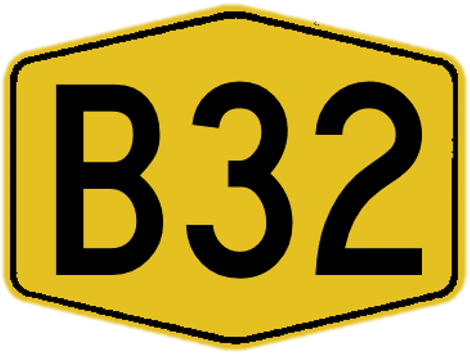
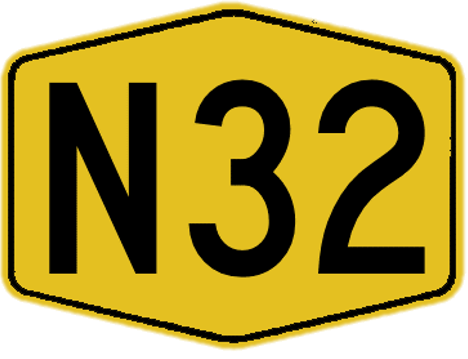
Selangor and Negeri Sembilan State Route B32 and N32

Route information
- Length: 39 km (24 mi)

Major junctions
- Northwest end: Kampung Gemi, Semenyih, Selangor
- Jalan Semenyih; FT 86 Federal Route 86
- Southeast end: Kuala Klawang, Negeri Sembilan

Location
- Country: Malaysia
- Primary destinations: Semenyih, Hulu Langat, Kampung Londah, Kampung Batu Putih, Titi, Kuala Klawang, Bahau

Highway system
- Highways in Malaysia; Expressways; Federal; State

Jalan Semenyih–Kuala Klawang (Selangor State Route B32 or Negeri Sembilan State Route N32) is a road connecting Semenyih of Hulu Langat district in Selangor and Kuala Klawang in Jelebu district of Negeri Sembilan. This road is known to have many dangerous sharp corners. This road is not a commonly used route; the more popular routes to Kuala Klawang are the Kajang–Seremban Highway and then Federal Route 86 from Seremban's Ampangan exit.

== Route background ==
To access this road, one must use Jalan Semenyih (Selangor State Route B19), Selangor State Route B116 (Jalan Sungai Tekali) or Jalan Gunung Nuang (Selangor State Route B52) and Federal Route 1 (from Kajang). There is a high risk of roadkill when using this road; wild animals are known to roam free here. The JKR cut some corners located from the start of the road at Semenyih to the border of Negeri Sembilan. Not far from the border of Negeri Sembilan, there is a small waterfall beside the road. The road used to have a very dangerous corner near the waterfall, but now the corner is cut by JKR. Now, the waterfall is at arm's length from the road. If you using this road, you are unaware of the waterfall.

== Junction lists ==
Legend:

- I/C - Interchange, I/S - Intersection, RSA - Rest and service area, OBR - Overhead bridge restaurant, R/R - Restaurant and rest plaza, L/B - Layby, V/P - Vista point, TN - tunnel, T/P - Toll plaza, BR - Bridge
- C - Cloverleaf, S - Stack, T-A - Trumpet-A, T-B - Trumpet-B, DT - Directional-T/Y, SDT - Semi-Directional-T/Y, P-Y - Partial-Y, D - Diamond, P-C - Partial cloverleaf, D-D - Diverging diamond, D-R - Direct ramp

State	District	Location	km	mi	Name	Destinations	Notes
Selangor	Hulu Langat	Semenyih			Semenyih; Kampung Gemi	Selangor State Route B19 – Pekan Batu Lapan Belas Pangsun, Gabai River, Sungai Congkak, Sungai Tekali Semenyih Dam, Hulu Langat, Sungai Tekala, Semenyih, Kajang	T-junctions
Selangor	Hulu Langat	Semenyih			Kampung Londah		
Selangor	Hulu Langat	Semenyih			Waterfall		
Negeri Sembilan	Jelebu	Titi			Genting Peras		
Negeri Sembilan	Jelebu	Titi			Kampung Batu Putih	N25 Jalan Chennah – Kampung Chennah, Lata Kijang waterfall, Orang Asli village	T-junctions
Negeri Sembilan	Jelebu	Titi			Titi North	N25 Jalan Chennah – Kampung Chennah, Jeram Gading Forest Reserve, Orang Asli village	T-junctions
Negeri Sembilan	Jelebu	Titi			Titi Eco Farm Resort		
Negeri Sembilan	Jelebu	Titi			Titi	N27 Jalan Kampung Purun – Kampung Purun	T-junctions
Negeri Sembilan	Jelebu	Titi			Kampung Ulu Spri	N27 Jalan Kampung Ulu Spri – Kampung Ulu Spri	T-junctions
Negeri Sembilan	Jelebu	Kuala Klawang			Kuala Klawang	FT 86 Malaysia Federal Route 86 – Pertang, Bahau, Hutan Lipur De Bana, Lenggeng, Seremban; N128 Jalan Ulu Jelebu – Ulu Jelebu	T-junctions
1.000 mi = 1.609 km; 1.000 km = 0.621 mi
