= Sungai Muntoh =

Town in Jelebu, Negeri Sembilan, Malaysia

- Hamlet

Other transcription(s)
  - Jawi: سوڠاي مونتوه
  - Chinese: 双溪文都
  - Tamil: முன்டோ நதி
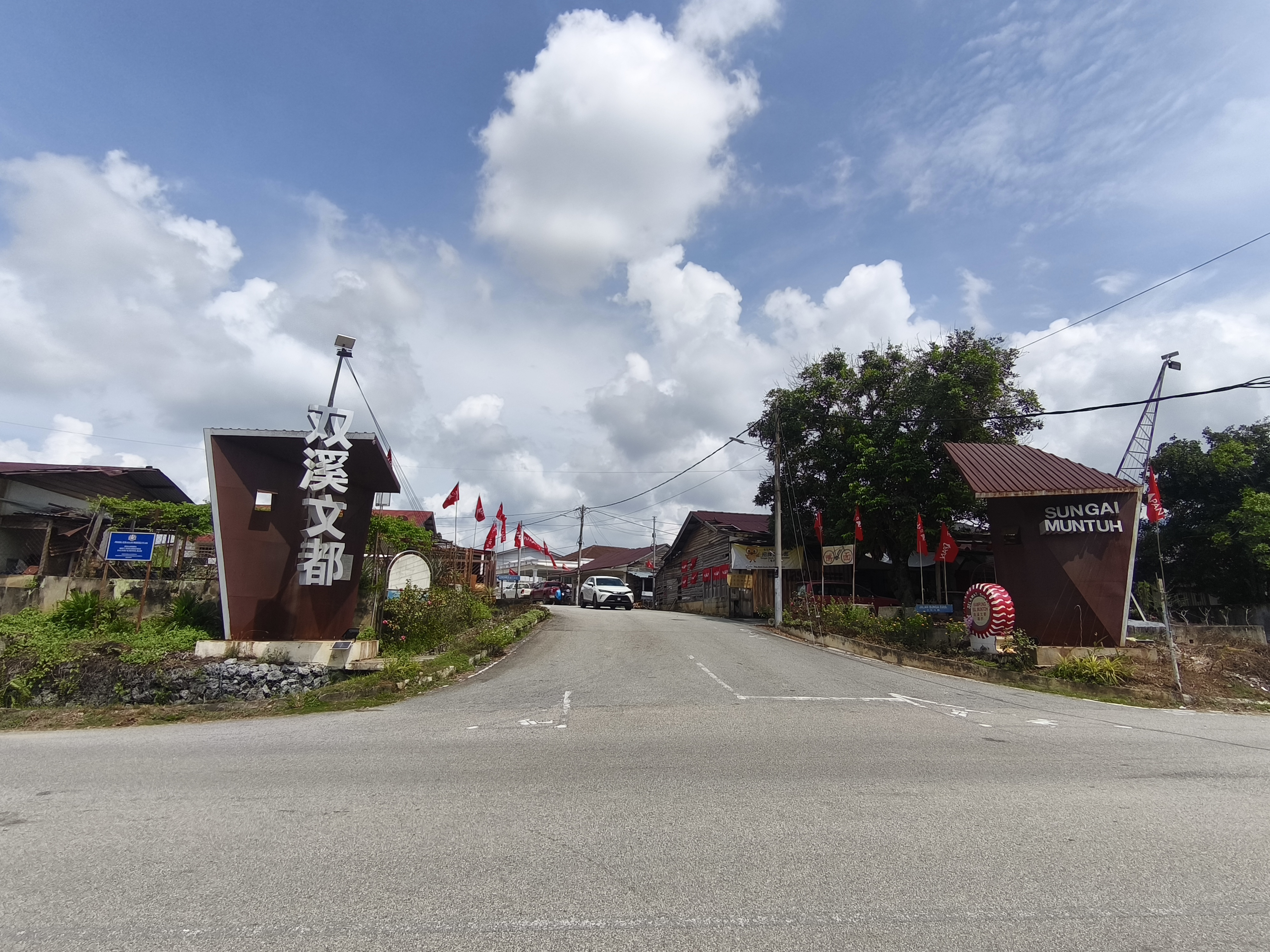

- Location of Sungai Muntoh Sungai Muntoh (Peninsular Malaysia) Sungai Muntoh (Malaysia)
- Coordinates: 3°1′0.62″N 102°5′26.27″E
- Country: Malaysia
- State: Negeri Sembilan
- District/Luak: Jelebu
- Time zone: UTC+8 (MYT)
- Postal code: 71600

Sungai Muntoh (Jawi: سوڠاي مونتوه; Chinese: 双溪文都) is a semi-agricultural small town in Jelebu District, Negeri Sembilan, Malaysia with less than 3,500 in total population. The town is located approximately 37 kilometres (23 mi) from the state capital of Seremban, 9 kilometres (5.6 mi) from Kuala Klawang, the district capital, and 18 kilometres (11 mi) from the border with Selangor.

Sungai Muntoh in Jelebu District

== Geography and climate ==
Sungai Muntoh is located at the northern fringe of an intermontane valley that encompasses central Jelebu, in the middle of the Negri Titiwangsa.

Sungai Muntoh is the warmest place in Malaysia. However, it also experiences heavy thunderstorms. In early February 2005, Malaysia's temperature rose to almost 39 °C (102 °F), the worst in 30 years and in Southeast Asia, second only to Myanmar. Being the warmest and driest place in Malaysia, Sungai Muntoh bares shortage of water supply and possible drought.

== History ==
Sungai Muntoh is believed to be founded by Chinese immigrants in early 19th century. The town's booming mining business and rubber plantation drew foreign indentured labors from China and India, who were paid low wages.

Sungai Muntoh has itself placed in the history of mining and rubber plantation in Negeri Sembilan. Sungai Muntoh was the earliest and most reputable mining site in Jelebu back in the late 19th century. A lot of valuable centuries-old artefacts were found there and are now displayed in the state's museum.

During World War II, when Jelebu was invaded by the Japanese, cruel acts performed on the locals included massacre and genocide. There were about 1,500 people killed during the Japanese invasion, and about 3,500 more in the rest of the state, making Negeri Sembilan one of the states having the highest death toll.

== Demographics ==
Sungai Muntoh is a neighbourhood with a Chinese majority. Ethnic Chinese (mostly Hakkas) accounts for almost 60% of the town's population while Malays, natives (Orang Asli) and some Indians make up the rest. Most of the Malays reside near a rehabilitation centre, working as law enforcers.

== Economy ==
Most Chinese of the older generation work in the rubber estate as rubber tappers. The rubber business is in decline over the years since younger generations seek to improve their lifestyles in nearby cities with most notably Kuala Lumpur and Seremban. Recently however, the rubber plantation industry undergoes a resurgency since world demand for rubber has increased since 2005.

Vegetable and fruit farming also contributes to the town's economy and prosperity. Vast land areas surrounding the town are planted with vegetables. Local sugarcanes and pineapples are famous throughout the country. Fruits that are grown in Sungai Muntoh include coconuts, rambutans, durians, mangosteens and mangos and other tropical fruits.

== Flora & fauna ==
Sungai Muntoh's dense rainforest is home to a huge variety of flora and faunas, including many endangered species. This includes tigers, crocodiles, wild boars and lizards. Rare types of blue-headed centipedes and the highly venomous colorful scorpions are found in Sungai Muntoh as well. A colorful peacock-like long-tailed flying creature about 2 ft tall was a usual sighting too, until illegal deforestation took place in less than a decade ago.

Serpents are common in this town. Black snakes are the only snakes native to Sungai Muntoh. Other species of snakes are rarely seen. Pythons—which can grow up to 5 meter long—are also one of the common sightings.

However, the rich biodiversity of the forest has brought problems to the local community as well. The town is famous for wild-animal invasion and attacks on livestocks and plantations. These include tigers, boars, crocodiles and others.

== Rehabilitation centres ==
There are more rehabilitation centres in Sungai Muntoh than in the rest of the state. The state's biggest and most reputable prison for junkies and drug addicts is located there. In early 1997, a breakout of the junkies became a national headline. Chaos and mayhem occurred when prison guards tried to arrest the fugitives on the streets. In late 2004, another similar headline caught the attention of NTV7. They did a full coverage on it, stating there could be a possible blue-collar crime going on. An investigation was initiated but to no avail.
