= Paroi =

- Suburb of Seremban
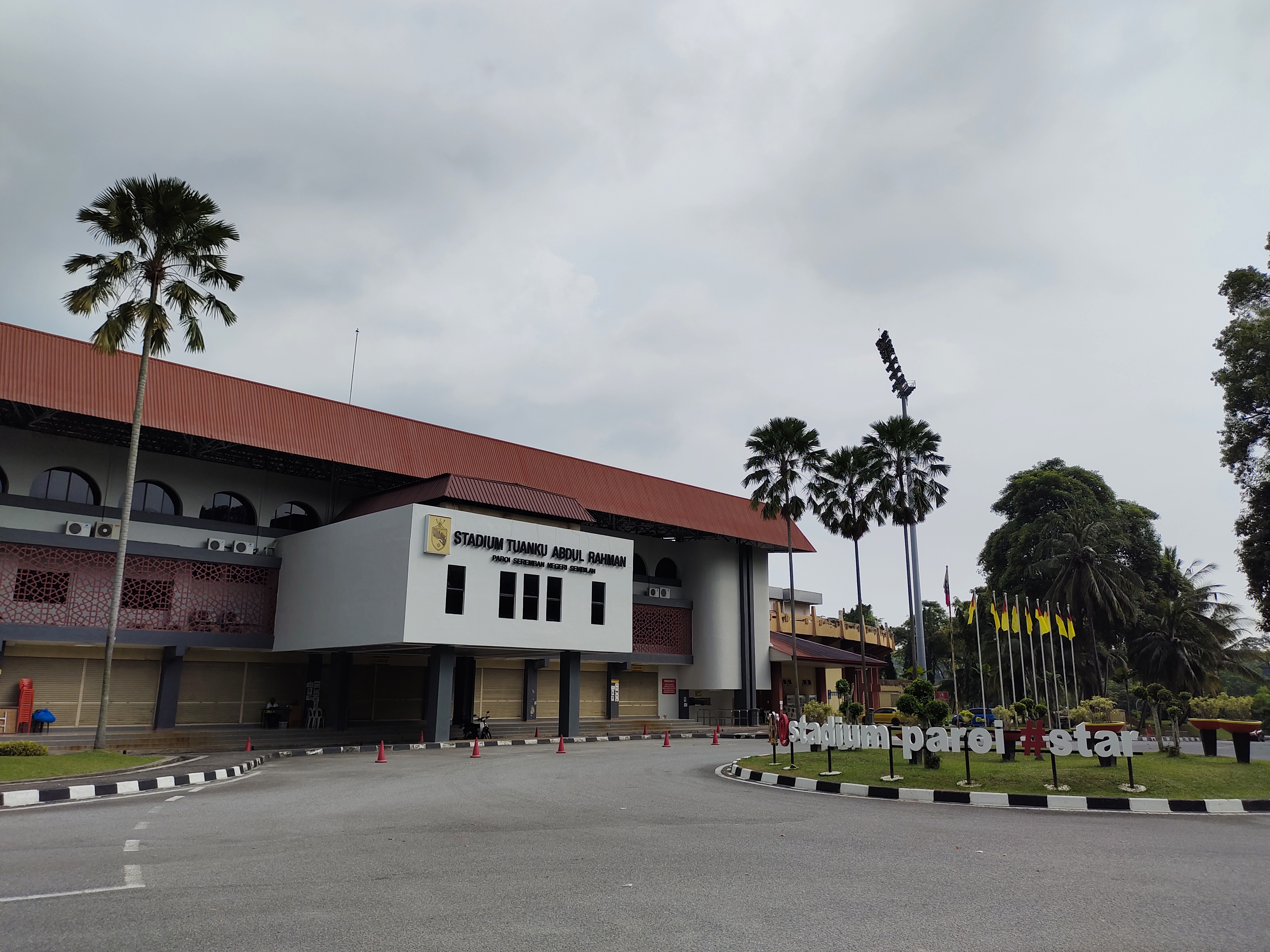
- Tuanku Abdul Rahman Stadium

- Location within Negeri Sembilan Location within Peninsular Malaysia Location within Malaysia
- Coordinates: 2°43′35″N 101°58′56″E
- Country: Malaysia
- State: Negeri Sembilan
- District: Seremban
- Luak: Sungai Ujong

Government
  - Body: Seremban City Council
  - Mayor: Masri Baharuddin
  - MP: Mohamad Hasan (BN–UMNO)
  - MLA: Kamarol Ridzuan Mohd Zain (PN–PAS)
- Time zone: UTC+8 (MST)
- Postcode: 70400

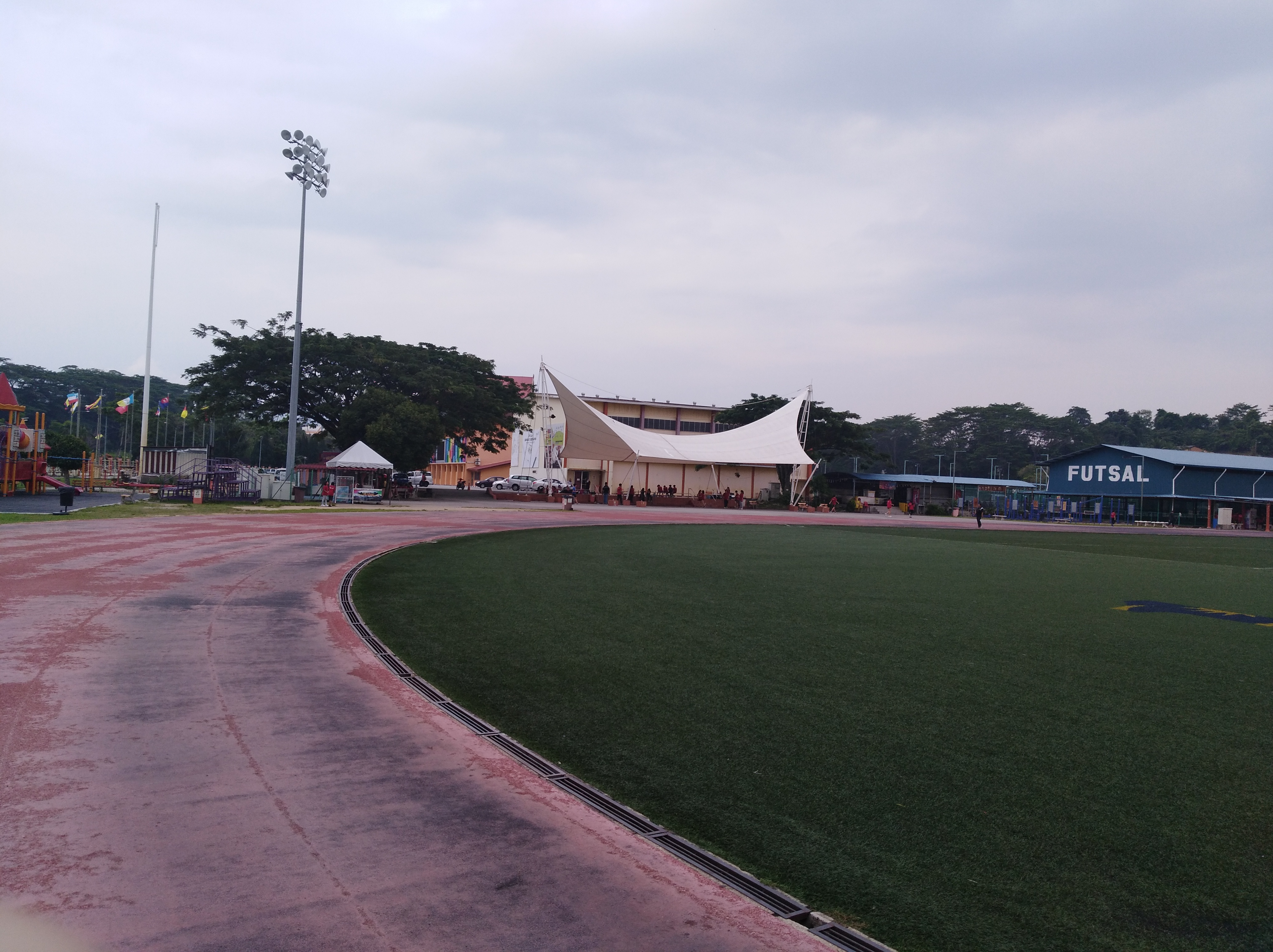
Track and field section of the Paroi Sports and Youth Centre.

Paroi in Seremban District

Paroi (Chinese: 傌尾; pinyin: Mǎwěi) is an area in Seremban District, Negeri Sembilan, Malaysia. It is the eastern suburb of the city of Seremban, consisting of housing estates and villages. Numerous sport facilities are built in Paroi, especially the state stadium, the Tuanku Abdul Rahman Stadium. Another sports centre is the Paroi Sports and Youth Centre, whose stadium was the first in Malaysia to have an artificial turf for its field. In addition, two other sports facilities – the State Sports Complex and the State Aquatic Sports Centre, are located next to Tuanku Abdul Rahman Stadium, and are situated opposite the Paroi Sports and Youth Centre. Also in Paroi is a golf course and a mosque.

== Transportation ==
Paroi is served by Route FT 51. Route FT 97 links the suburb to Senawang. Inside Paroi is the Jalan Tok Dagang N101 which serves some of the housing estates in Paroi such as Taman Paroi Jaya and Taman Panchor Jaya. Jalan Tok Dagang also links Paroi to Route FT 86 and Kajang–Seremban Highway via EXIT 2106 (Ampangan).
