= Simpang Pertang =

Town in Jelebu, Negeri Sembilan, Malaysia

Simpang Pertang Simpang Poghotang (Negeri Sembilan Malay)
- Town
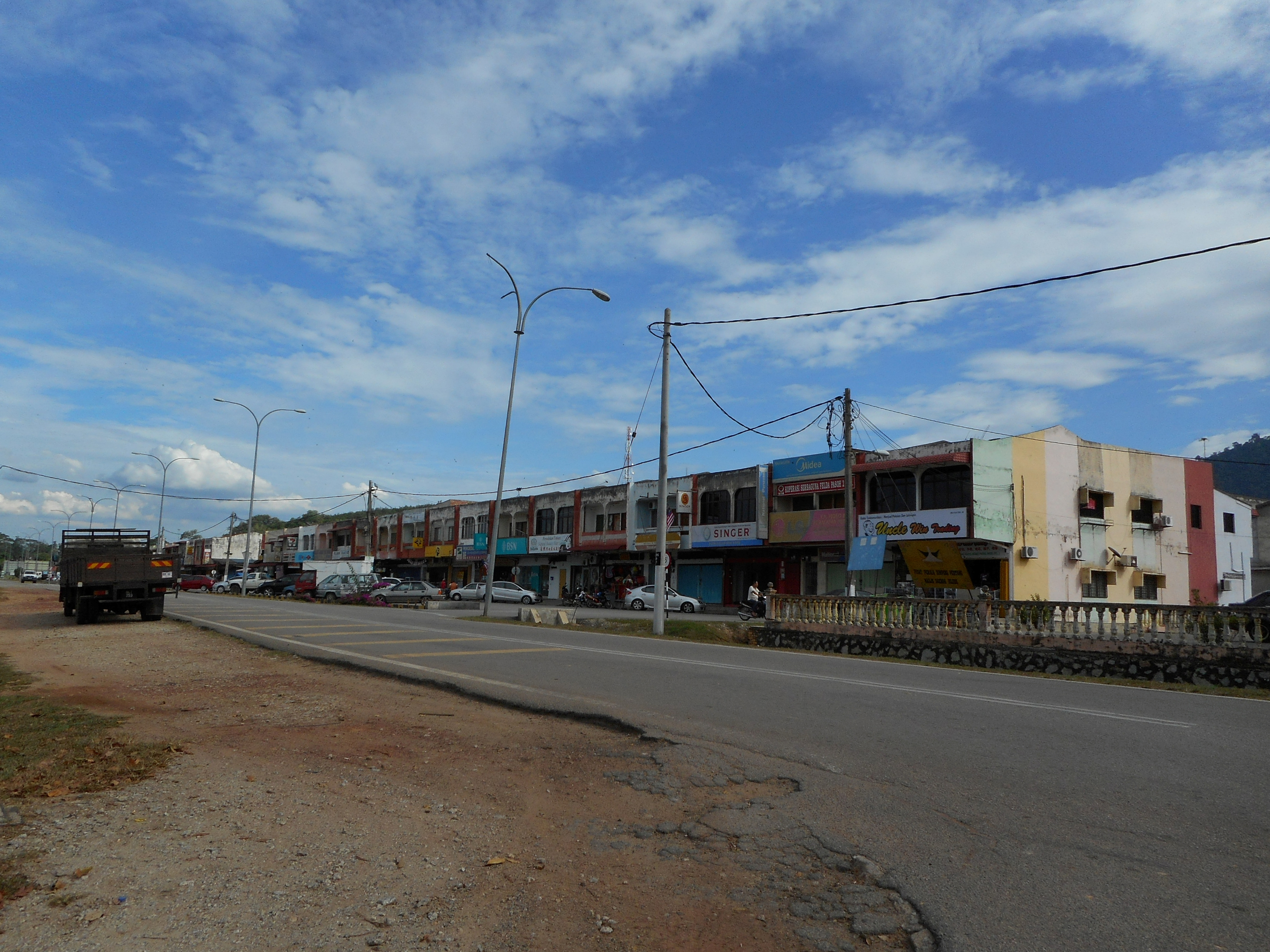

- Location of Simpang Pertang Simpang Pertang (Peninsular Malaysia) Simpang Pertang (Malaysia)
- Coordinates: 2°57′N 102°16′E
- Country: Malaysia
- State: Negeri Sembilan
- District: Jelebu
- Luak: Jelebu

Government
  - Body: Jelebu District Council
  - President: Mohamad Syahanaz Mustapah
  - MP: Jalaluddin Alias (BN–UMNO)
  - MLA: Jalaluddin Alias (BN–UMNO)
- Time zone: UTC+8 (MYT)
- Postal code: 72300

Simpang Pertang in Jelebu District

Simpang Pertang (Negeri Sembilan Malay: Simpang Poghotang) is a small town in Jelebu District, Negeri Sembilan, Malaysia. It is a few kilometres away from the town of Pertang, which the intersection is named after. The town is located on the district boundary with Jempol.

It is best known as the intersection of federal routes 9, which leads to Karak and Kuala Pilah and 86, which leads to Kuala Klawang, Pantai and ultimately Seremban.
