= Kajang Bypass =

Road in Malaysia

Kajang Bypass Jalan Pintasan Kajang 加影绕道

Route information
- Length: 7.5 km (4.7 mi)
- Existed: 1997–present
- History: Completed in 2004

Major junctions
- Beltway around Kajang
- Northwest end: Saujana Impian
- Cheras–Kajang Expressway; Kajang Dispersal Link Expressway; Kajang–Seremban Highway
- Southeast end: Kajang Perdana Interchange

Location
- Country: Malaysia
- Primary destinations: Kuala Lumpur, Cheras, Seremban, Semenyih

Highway system
- Highways in Malaysia; Expressways; Federal; State

Kajang Bypass is the 7.5-km main arterial bypass in Kajang, Selangor, Malaysia. It connects the E7/FT1 Cheras–Kajang Expressway and the E21 Kajang–Seremban Highway. Kajang Bypass is one of the three highway projects being constructed to ease the congestion of Kajang town centre.

== Route background ==
The Kajang Bypass begins as the continuation of the E7/FT1 Cheras–Kajang Expressway. At Exit 708 Saujana Impian Interchange, the E7/FT1 Cheras–Kajang Expressway is downgraded into an arterial road and becomes the Kajang Bypass before once again being upgraded to a controlled-access expressway and continues as the E21 Kajang–Seremban Highway.

The bypass is divided into 3 main section. The first section from Exit 708 Saujana Impian Interchange to Sungai Kantan is managed by Kajang Municipal Council. The second section from Sungai Kantan to Exit 1805 Kajang Perdana Interchange is managed by the Malaysian Public Works Department (JKR). The final section from Exit 1805 Kajang Perdana Interchange to Exit 2101 Kajang South Interchange is a part of the E21 Kajang–Seremban Highway.

== History ==
The Kajang Bypass was constructed to relieve the congestion in the town centre of Kajang, together with the E18 Kajang Dispersal Link Expressway and the E21 Kajang–Seremban Highway. The construction was started in 1997 and was supposed to be completed in 2000; however, the bypass could not be completed on time due to delays of the construction of the Kajang–Seremban Highway project. The final section from Kajang Perdana to Jalan Semenyih FT1 was only completed in 2004 and was opened to traffic on 15 March 2004.

The Kajang Bypass was constructed at the cost of RM 20 million.

== Junction lists ==
The entire route is located in Hulu Langat District, Selangor.

Legend:

- I/C - Interchange, I/S - Intersection, RSA - Rest and service area, OBR - Overhead bridge restaurant, R/R - Restaurant and rest plaza, L/B - Layby, V/P - Vista point, TN - tunnel, T/P - Toll plaza, BR - Bridge
- C - Cloverleaf, S - Stack, T-A - Trumpet-A, T-B - Trumpet-B, DT - Directional-T/Y, SDT - Semi-Directional-T/Y, P-Y - Partial-Y, D - Diamond, P-C - Partial cloverleaf, D-D - Diverging diamond, D-R - Direct ramp

Location	km	mi	Exit	Name	Destinations	Notes
Kajang			Through to Cheras–Kajang Expressway / FT 1			
Kajang				Kajang I/C	FT 1 Jalan Cheras–Kajang – Kampung Bukit Dukung, Kajang town centre, Bangi	Diamond interchange
Kajang				Saujana Impian; Saujana Impian I/S	Persiaran Impian Perdana – Saujana Impian Golf and Country Club	T-junctions with direct ramp to Kajang Bypass
Kajang				Jenaris I/C	Jalan Jenaris – Desa Sri Jenaris; B212 Jalan Sungai Kantan – Kajang Prima Saujana, Taman Kantan Permai, Pinggiran Saujana, Kajang	Diamond interchange
Kajang				Bukit Wira I/C	Bukit Wira – Kajang Prison	LILO Interchange
Kajang				Kajang Perdana I/C	Kajang Dispersal Link Expressway – Sungai Long, Balakong, Sungai Besi, Seri Kembangan, Kuala Lumpur, Seremban, Johor Bahru, Putrajaya, Cyberjaya, Kuala Lumpur International Airport (KLIA)	Cloverleaf interchange
Kajang			Through to Kajang–Seremban Highway			
1.000 mi = 1.609 km; 1.000 km = 0.621 mi: Incomplete access; Route transition
