= Simpang Durian =

Town in Jelebu, Negeri Sembilan, Malaysia

Simpang Durian Simpang Duyan (Negeri Sembilan Malay)
- Town in
- Location of Simpang Durian Simpang Durian (Peninsular Malaysia) Simpang Durian (Malaysia)
- Coordinates: 3°1′N 102°11′E
- Country: Malaysia
- State: Negeri Sembilan
- District/Luak: Jelebu
- Time zone: UTC+8 (MYT)
- Postal code: 72400

Simpang Durian in Jelebu District

Simpang Durian (Negeri Sembilan Malay: Simpang Duyan) is a small town in Jelebu District, Negeri Sembilan, Malaysia. It is situated about 10 km from the Pahang border and about 130 km from Kuala Lumpur. Simpang Durian is also a popular stopover destination for super bikers from Singapore and southern states of West Malaysia to rest and refuel before proceeding to Genting Highlands.

== History ==
Simpang Durian is believed to have been occupied by Orang Asli a long time ago. The name of Simpang Durian means junction of durian. About 100 years ago, there were many durian plantations ran by the British colonial government and these durian trees were planted all the way to the junction. The name then was widely adapted by locals, and as such the name Simpang Durian became the norm. During the Communist time or emergency time, the government relocated the people from the surrounding area by the insurgent communist threat. The government declared the area as a settlement with army observation.

== Demographics ==
The population in Simpang Durian is Malay 70%, Chinese 25%, Indian 1% and Orang Asli 4%. Most are immigrants and settlers from Sumatera (mostly Minangkabau descendants from Luak 50 Koto, Sumatera Barat) while Chinese from mainland China came to work in tin mines. Others are aboriginals such as Semang, Temuan people, Besisi and Jakun people.

== Climate ==
Due to its proximity to the Equator, the climate of Simpang Durian is hot and humid all year round and is one of Malaysia's driest places.

== Location ==
Simpang Durian is rapidly developing due to its strategic location between the road to Johor Bahru and Gua Musang. Radius distance to Kuala Lumpur is about 50 km. Some of the nearest town is Bahau (45 km), Kuala Pilah (50 km), (Kuala Klawang 35 km), (Seremban 70 km), and Karak (50 km). People from the south part of Malaysia can reach the town via Bahau, from Kuala Lumpur via Seremban, or Karak either Hulu Langat district in Selangor or Kuala Klawang in Jelebu district of Negeri Sembilan. This road is known for its many dangerous and sharp corners. There is no bus service to Simpang Durian, but there are taxi services to and from Seremban, Bahau or Kuala Klawang.

== Economy ==
Historically, the major source of income in Simpang Durian was the timber industry which greatly contributed to the town's growth in the past decades. The cultivation of palm oil and rubber also had a significant impact on Simpang Durian's economy. Sugarcane plantations are abundant in Simpang Durian, and the town is said to produce the best sugarcane in the country due to its hot climate and minimal rainfall. Sugarcane produce is also widely imported to Singapore.

== Culture ==
Most of the Malay people in Simpang Durian follow Adat Perpatih, (also known as Lareh Bodi Caniago), customary laws that originated from the Minangkabau Highlands Sumatra, Indonesia. It was founded by a Minangkabau leader named Sutan Balun or more famously known as Dato' Perpatih Nan Sebatang. In Malaysia, Adat Perpatih is a combination of practices and rules of life for the Minangkabau people and other aboriginals who were mostly farmers at that time. Over time, this custom has been adapted by other ethnicities in parts of Malacca, Masjid Tanah in particular, and parts of Johor.

== Local cuisine ==
Masak lemak cili api, a traditional hot and spicy Negeri Sembilan dish, is the famous food in the area. "Cili padi" was included in the dish's name as one of the main ingredients used is the cili padi, a scorching chilli pepper. Other popular dishes include rendang (pieces of beef cooked in coconut milk and chillies),Masak Lomak Cili Padi, fish, meat, or vegetables cooked in coconut milk blended with turmeric and ground chilli padi. Another Negeri Sembilan speciality is "lomang", glutinous rice cooked in coconut milk in a bamboo stem over an open fire and is normally served with rendang.

== Places of interest ==
Simpang Durian is known for its mountain and paddy field views. There is also an annual kayaking event called Kenaboi River Challenge.

== Accommodation ==
There are a few homestays available in Simpang Durian. The nearest hotel is Hotel Seri Klawang which cost about Rm80 per night.

== Other facilities ==
There are a 24 hours Petronas petrol station (petrol and diesel only) with ATM. Other facilities include Agrobank, post office, 7-Eleven, and restaurants with wifi until 2:30 am. Even though Simpang Durian is a small town, people from surrounding areas and smaller towns stop by in Simpang Durian to refuel and use an ATM service.

== Flora and fauna ==
The rainforest around Simpang Durian is home to various flora and fauna, such as tongkat ali (ginseng), and kacip Fatimah, and many endangered species of wildlife. Reserved forest areas such as Hutan Simpan Triang and Hutan Simpan Kenaboi have been established, which serves as a natural habitat for wild animals such as tigers, wild boars, bears, tapirs, and monkeys.
