= Malaysia Federal Route 86 =

Road in Malaysia

Federal Route 86
- Jalan Jelebu; Jalan Seremban-Simpang Pertang

Route information
- Maintained by Malaysian Public Works Department
- Length: 58.8 km (36.5 mi)
- Existed: 1911–present
- History: Completed in 1919.

Major junctions
- Northeast end: Simpang Pertang
- FT 9 Federal Route 9 State Route N32; N101 State Route N101; Kajang–Seremban Highway; FT 51 Federal Route 51
- Southwest end: Seremban

Location
- Country: Malaysia
- Primary destinations: Karak, Bahau, Pertang, Kuala Klawang

Highway system
- Highways in Malaysia; Expressways; Federal; State

Federal Route 86, also known as Jalan Jelebu or Jalan Seremban–Simpang Pertang, is a main federal roads in Negeri Sembilan, Malaysia. The roads connects Seremban town in the south to Simpang Pertang, Jelebu in the north. It was the earliest federal roads in Negeri Sembilan, built in 1911 by the Federated Malay States (FMS) government.

== Route background ==
The Kilometre Zero of the Federal Route 86 starts at Seremban. The road meets with E21 LEKAS Highway and N101 Jalan Tok Dagang at Ampangan. The road then continues on to Pantai, ascending the Titiwangsa Mountains as a mountain pass, and eventually crosses the Seremban - Jelebu district boundary. The Federal Route 86 passes through the centre of Kuala Klawang and continues its way to Simpang Pertang, ending its route at the intersection with the FT9 Federal Route 9 at Simpang Pertang.

== Features ==
At most sections, the Federal Route 86 was built under the JKR R5 road standard, allowing maximum speed limit of up to 90 km/h , although it can be 30km/h at windy areas such as Jeram Toi.

== Junction lists ==
The entire route is located in Negeri Sembilan.

Legend:

- I/C - Interchange, I/S - Intersection, RSA - Rest and service area, OBR - Overhead bridge restaurant, R/R - Restaurant and rest plaza, L/B - Layby, V/P - Vista point, TN - tunnel, T/P - Toll plaza, BR - Bridge
- C - Cloverleaf, S - Stack, T-A - Trumpet-A, T-B - Trumpet-B, DT - Directional-T/Y, SDT - Semi-Directional-T/Y, P-Y - Partial-Y, D - Diamond, P-C - Partial cloverleaf, D-D - Diverging diamond, D-R - Direct ramp

District	Location	km	mi	Name	Destinations	Notes
Jelebu	Simpang Pertang	58.8	36.5	Simpang Pertang	FT 9 Malaysia Federal Route 9 – Karak, Mancis, Bentong, Kuala Pilah, Bahau	T-junctions
Jelebu	Pertang			Pertang	N19 Jalan Geylang – Batu Kikir, Kampung Geylang, Kampung Ghalib	T-junctions
Jelebu	Kuala Klawang			Jalan Kerangai	N23 Jalan Kerangai – Kampung Kerangai, Simpang Durian, Karak	T-junctions
Jelebu	Kuala Klawang			Kampung Chawas	N133 Jalan Pelaseh – Kampung Pelaseh Tengah, Kampung Pelaseh	T-junctions
Jelebu	Kuala Klawang			Jalan Pelaseh Ulu	N136 Jalan Pelaseh Ulu – Kampung Pelaseh Ulu	T-junctions
Jelebu	Kuala Klawang			Kampung Jelatang		
Jelebu	Kuala Klawang			Jalan Pelaseh Ulu	N136 Jalan Pelaseh Ulu – Kampung Pelaseh Ulu	T-junctions
Jelebu	Kuala Klawang			Kampung Sungai Gunung Pergai		
Jelebu	Kuala Klawang			Kampung Peradong		
Jelebu	Kuala Klawang			Kampung Belai		
Jelebu	Kuala Klawang			Kampung Baharu	N27 Jalan Sungai Gunung Rotan – Kampung Sungai Gunung Rotan	T-junctions
Jelebu	Kuala Klawang			Kampung Simpang Gelam		
Jelebu	Kuala Klawang			Kampung Chenor		
Jelebu	Kuala Klawang			Kampung Jelin		
Jelebu	Kuala Klawang			Sungai Teriang bridge		
Jelebu	Kuala Klawang			Kampung Merbau		
Jelebu	Kuala Klawang			Kampung Bandar Tinggi		
Jelebu	Kuala Klawang			Kuala Klawang		
Jelebu	Kuala Klawang			Kuala Klawang	Jalan Semenyih–Kuala Klawang – Semenyih, Hulu Langat, Sungai Gabai waterfall, Sungai Chongkak waterfall, Lata Kijang waterfall N128 Jalan Ulu Jelebu – Ulu Jelebu	T-junctions
Jelebu	Kuala Klawang			Kuala Klawang	Muzium Adat	
Jelebu	Kuala Klawang			Kuala Klawang Memorial		
Jelebu	Kuala Klawang			Kampung Jambatan Serong		
Jelebu	Kuala Klawang			Kampung Lalang		
Jelebu	Kuala Klawang			Kampung Batu Serambai		
Jelebu	Kuala Klawang			Kampung Batu Seremban		
Jelebu	Kuala Klawang			Kampung Benal	N153 Jalan Benal – Kampung Ulu Benal	T-junctions
Jelebu	Kuala Klawang			Kampung Ulu Klawang		
Jelebu	Kuala Klawang			Jeram Toi waterfalls		
Seremban	Pantai	22.0	13.7	–		
Seremban	Pantai			Jalan Lenggeng	N30 Jalan Lenggeng – Lenggeng, Mantin, Broga	T-junctions
Seremban	Pantai			Kampung Enggang		
Seremban	Pantai			Kampung Jelawai		
Seremban	Pantai			Temiang–Pantai Highway	FT 366 Malaysia Federal Route 366 – Temiang, Desa Temiang; Kajang–Seremban Highway – Kuala Lumpur, Kajang, Kuala Pilah	T-junctions
Seremban	Pantai			Kampung Telaga		
Seremban	Pantai			Kampung Denet		
Seremban	Pantai			Pantai		
Seremban	Pantai			Kampung Manggis		
Seremban	Pantai			Kampung Gedang		
Seremban	Pantai			Jalan Sikamat	N38 Jalan Sikamat – Sikamat	T-junctions
Seremban	Pantai			Kampung Jerlang		
Seremban	Pantai			Kampung Kuala Jerlang		
Seremban	Pantai			Kampung Bukit Kubot		
Seremban	Pantai			Kampung Sungai Terip		
Seremban	Ampangan			Ampangan-LEKAS	Kajang–Seremban Highway – Kuala Lumpur, Kajang, Setul, Paroi, Kuala Pilah, Senawang	Half folded diamond interchange
Seremban	Ampangan			Jalan Tok Dagang	N101 Negeri Sembilan State Route N101 – Paroi, Kuala Pilah	T-junctions
Seremban	Ampangan			Pantai Industrial Area		
Seremban	Ampangan			Taman Kayu Manis	Jalan Palas 1 – Taman Kayu Manis, Taman Ujong Pasir	T-junctions
Seremban	Seremban	0.0	0.0	Seremban	FT 51 Malaysia Federal Route 51 – Seremban town centre, Senawang, Kuala Pilah, Paroi	T-junctions
1.000 mi = 1.609 km; 1.000 km = 0.621 mi
