= Custom Museum =

Museum in Jelebu, Negeri Sembilan, Malaysia

- Muzium Adat
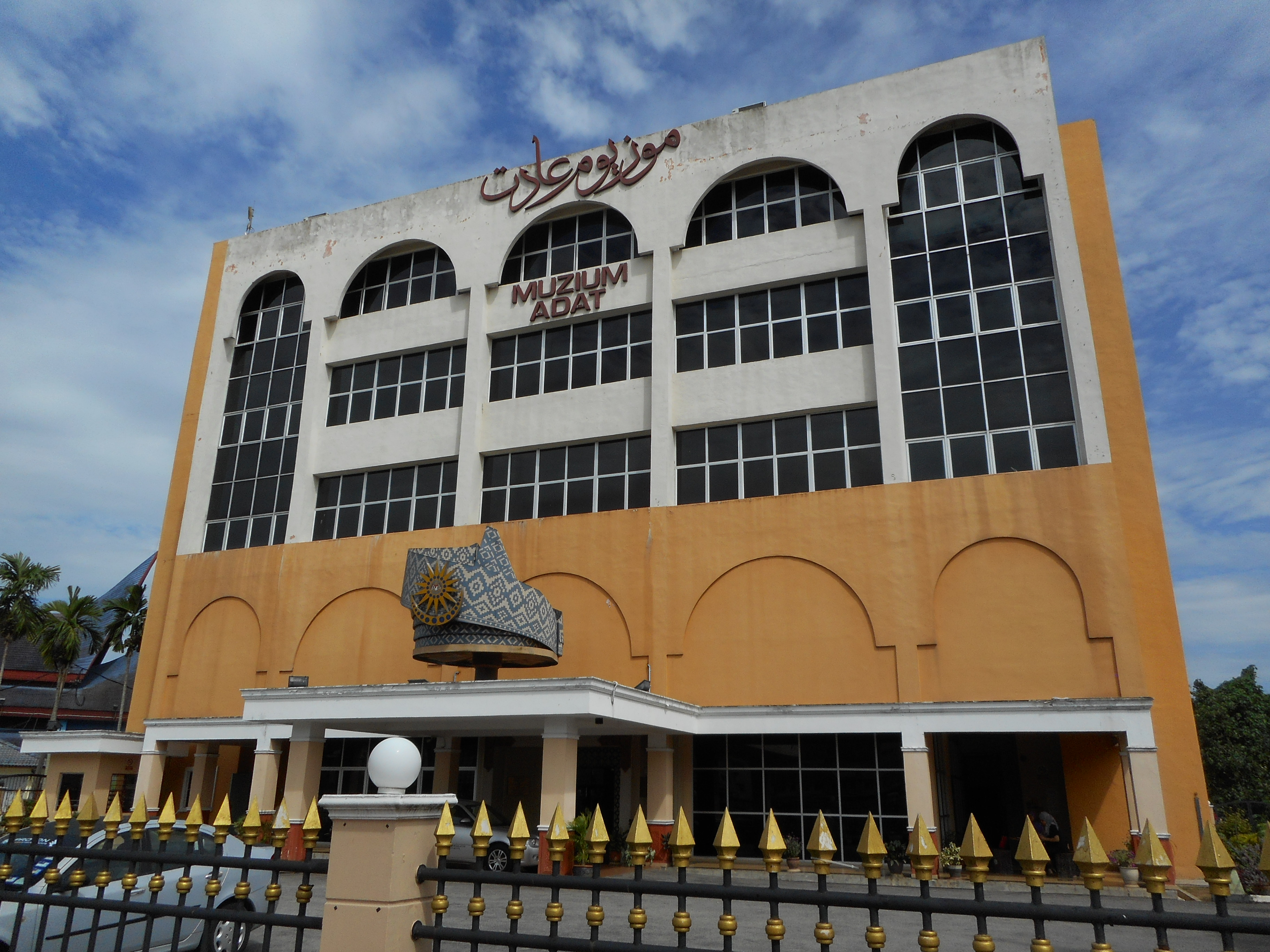
- Established: 2 February 2008
- Location: Kuala Klawang, Negeri Sembilan, Malaysia
- Coordinates: 2°56′15.5″N 102°4′15.9″E
- Type: museum

The Customs Museum (Malay: Muzium Adat) is a museum in Kuala Klawang, Jelebu District, Negeri Sembilan, Malaysia, which exhibits facets and lifestyle of the Malaysian people and identity of Negeri Sembilan. It was constructed in 2005 and officially opened on 2 February 2008 by Negeri Sembilan Chief Minister Mohamad Hasan and Minister for Culture, Arts and Heritage Rais Yatim. The museum is housed in a four-story building, with a giant replica of Malay headdress at the top of its entrance and consists of four galleries which are: Introduction of custom, Life cycle, Intellectual tradition, government and power and Pepatih customs.

== See also ==
- List of museums in Malaysia
