= Saujana Impian =

Township in Selangor, Malaysia

Saujana Impian is an affluent township in Hulu Langat District, Selangor, Malaysia. This township is located about two kilometers away from Kajang town. The Impian Golf & Country Club is located within this township.

Saujana Impian were developed in phases, and as such the township is geographically separated by sub-township development as below,

- Impian Jaya - Fasa 1 (Teres Dua Tingkat) & Fasa 2 (Semi-D)
- Impian Gemilang - Fasa 3A (Semi-D) & Fasa 3B (Teres Dua Tingkat)
- Impian Indah - Fasa 4 (Teres Dua Tingkat)
- Impian Murni - Fasa 5 (Teres Dua Tingkat)
- Impian Kasih - Fasa 5 (Teres Dua Tingkat)
- Impian Setia - Fasa 5 (Teres Dua Tingkat)
- Impian Makmur - Fasa 6C Sapphire - (Semi-D)
- Impian Makmur - Fasa 7 (Apartment)

== Educations ==
There are a few schools within the vicinity, with a mix of primary and secondary schools.

- Sekolah Kebangsaan Saujana Impian (Awards: Sekolah Harapan Negara, Sekolah Cemerlang, Sekolah, Anugerah Cemerlang Kokurikulum, Anugerah Cemerlang Bilik Operasi SPBT, Anugerah Cemerlang Pengurusan NILAM, Anugerah Tawaran Baru).
- Sekolah Kebangsaan Saujana Impian 2
- Sekolah Menengah Kebangsaan Saujana Impian
- Sekolah Menengah Sultan Abdul Aziz Shah (SAAS)

== Transportation ==
=== Car ===
Saujana Impian is accessible through several highways. Most notable highways are Cheras–Kajang Expressway (part of Federal Route 1 system) connecting to Cheras and Kuala Lumpur, and Kajang–Seremban Highway (LEKAS) connecting to Seremban and Kuala Pilah.

=== Public transportation ===
MRT Sungai Jernih and MRT Bukit Dukung.
