= Ampangan =

- Suburb of Seremban
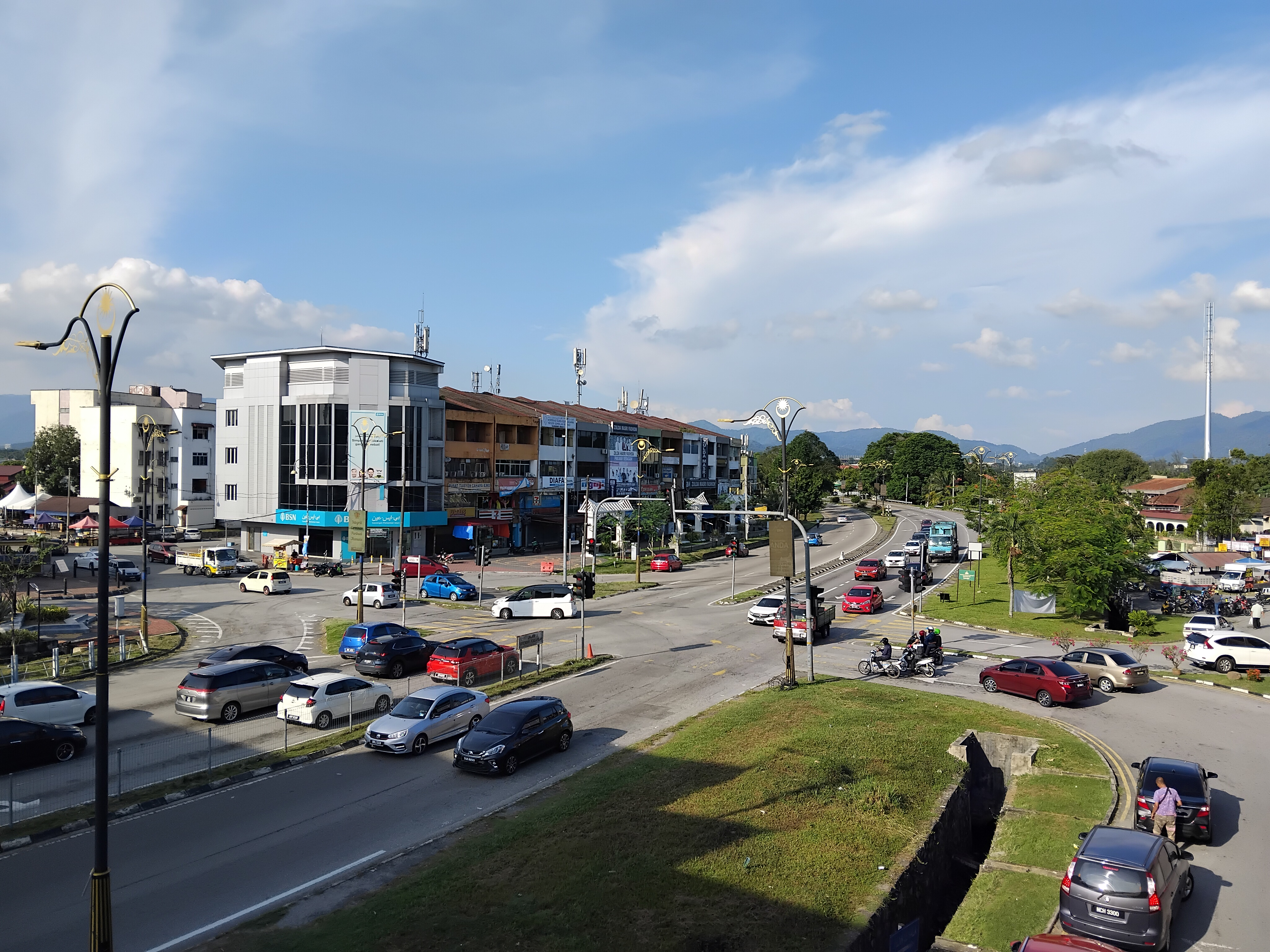
- Federal Route 51, Ampangan

- Location within Negeri Sembilan Location within Peninsular Malaysia Location within Malaysia
- Coordinates: 2°43′23″N 101°57′44″E
- Country: Malaysia
- State: Negeri Sembilan
- District: Seremban
- Luak: Sungai Ujong

Government
  - Body: Seremban City Council
  - Mayor: Masri Baharuddin
  - MP: Anthony Loke (PH–DAP)
  - MLA: Mohamad Rafie Abdul Malek (PN–PAS)
- Time zone: UTC+8 (MST)
- Postcode: 70400

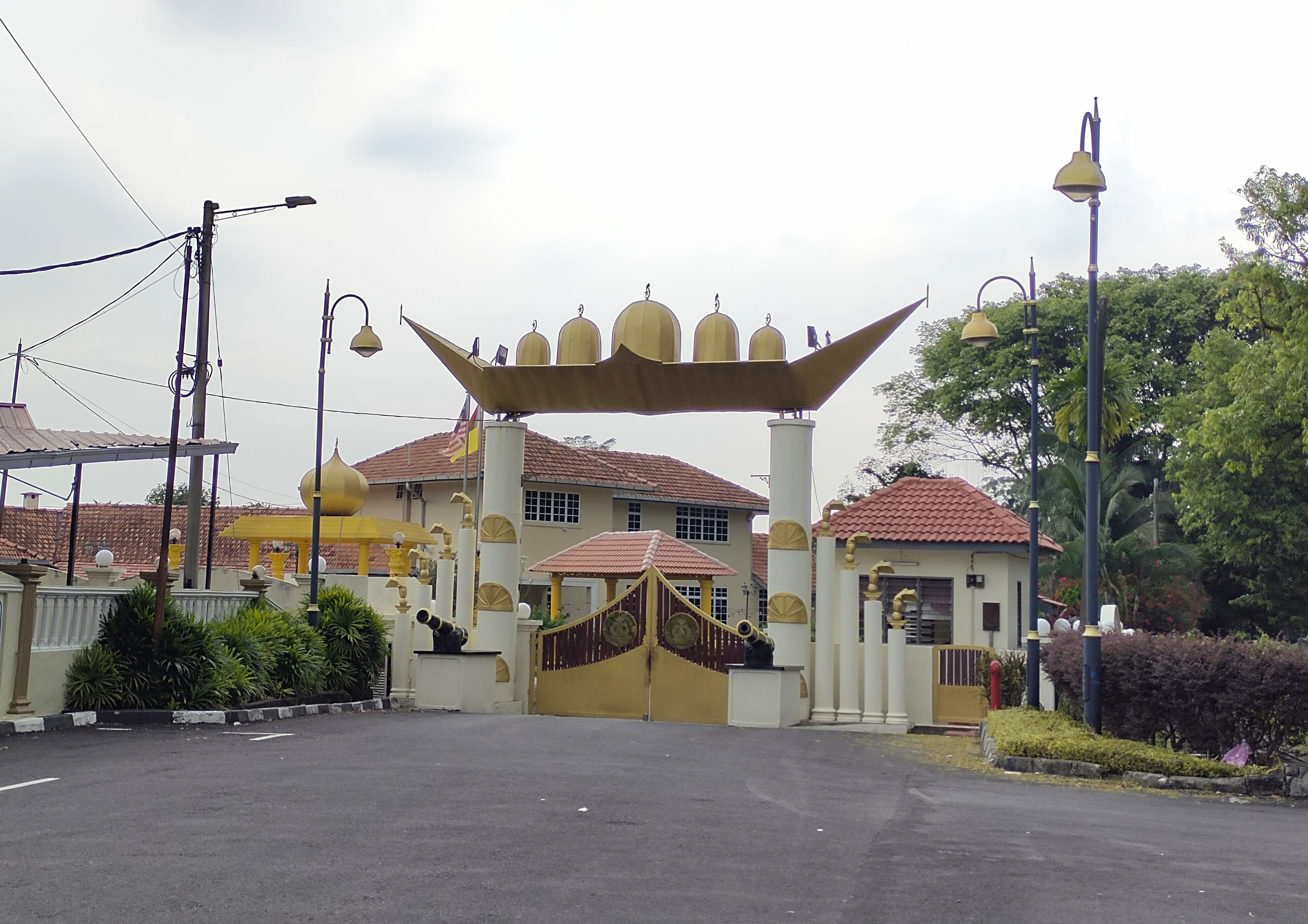
Residence of the Undang of the Luak of Sungai Ujong

Ampangan in Seremban District

Ampangan is a suburb and a mukim in Seremban District, Negeri Sembilan, Malaysia.

== Toponymy ==
The name Ampangan is a variation of the Malay word empangan which means dam. The local name recorded in use among the Chinese was Tan-yung (Chinese: 旦容; Jyutping: tan^{6}jung^{4}; pinyin: Dànróng).

== Townscape ==
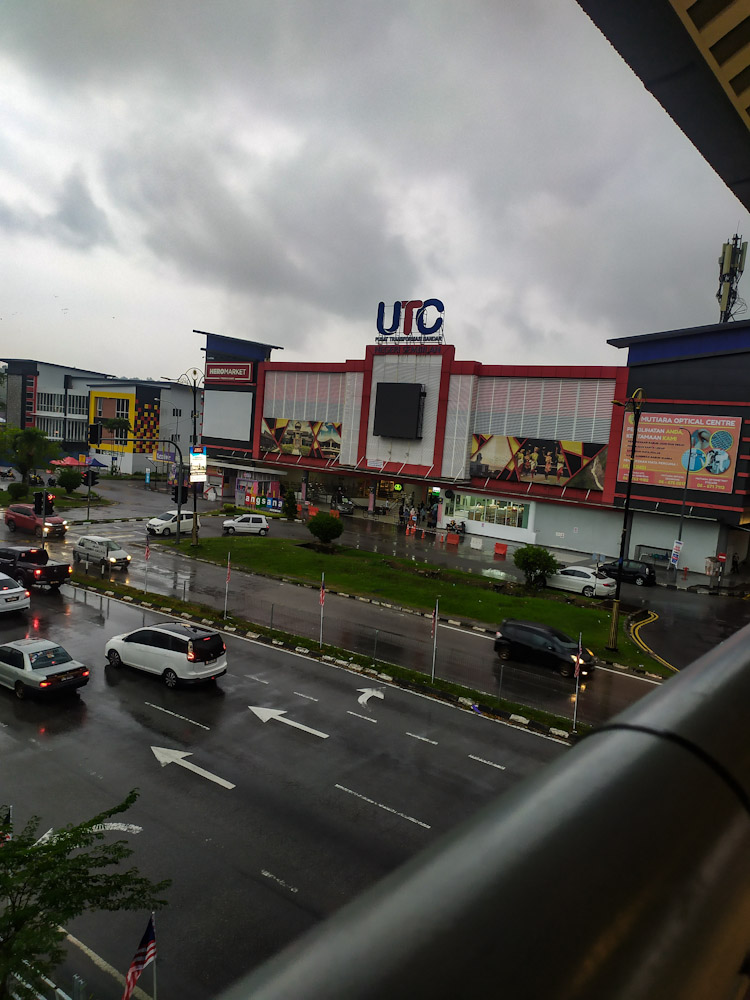
UTC building in Ampangan.

Ampangan is situated on the eastern bank of the Batang Penar River, a tributary of the Linggi River. The official residence of the Undang (Chieftain) of the Luak of Sungai Ujong and the Urban Transformation Centre for Seremban is located there.

Ampangan has a pasar malam (night market) on every Tuesday and Friday evening. People in the surrounding areas dubbed it as Pasar Malam Ampangan. According to some people the night market has been operating since the 1970s. The night market offers varieties of delicacies, mostly Malay traditional staples and kuih, which include apam balik, murtabak, nasi goreng, keropok lekor, satay, kuih kacang, etc. In addition, there are also numerous eateries being established, notably Benteng Ampangan and Medan Selera PSMA.

=== Education ===
There are two vocational schools, Kolej Vokasional Ampangan and Sekolah Menengah Teknik Tuanku Ja'afar. There are also two primary schools, Sekolah Kebangsaan King George V and Sekolah Kebangsaan Ampangan as well as two secondary schools, Sekolah Menengah Kebangsaan Sri Ampangan and Sekolah Menengah Agama Dato' Klana Petra Ma'amor.

== Transportation ==
Federal Routes FT 86 and FT 51 links Ampangan with Kuala Klawang and Kuala Pilah respectively. The Kajang–Seremban Highway also serves Ampangan at EXIT 2106, providing access to the Klang Valley.

Ampangan is the eastern end of the Seremban Inner Ring Road.
