= Pantai =

- Mukim
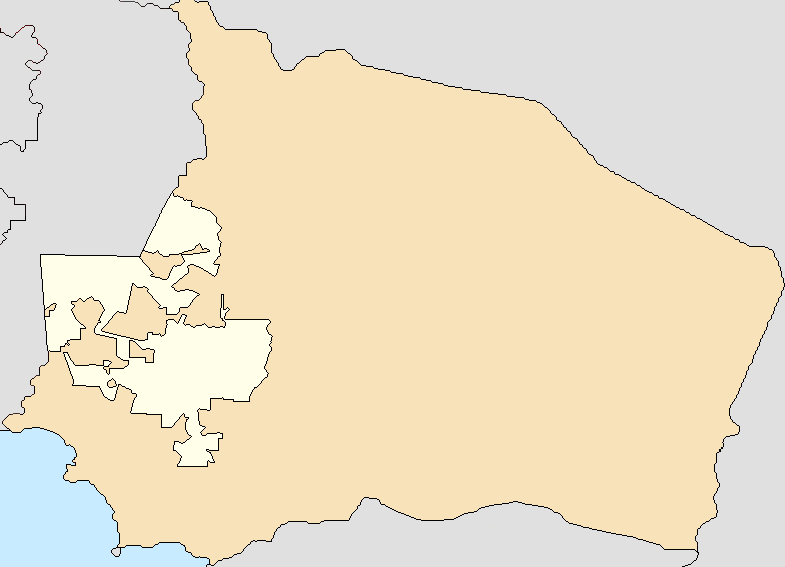
- Location within Seremban
- Coordinates: 2.7815°N 101.9932°E
- Country: Malaysia
- State: Negeri Sembilan
- District: Seremban
- Luak: Sungai Ujong

Government
  - Body: Seremban City Council
  - Mayor: Masri Baharuddin
  - MP: Anthony Loke (PH–DAP}
  - MLA: Mohamad Rafie Abdul Malek (PN–PAS)
- Elevation: 90 m (300 ft)
- Time zone: UTC+8 (MST)
- Postcode: 71770

Mukim Pantai in Seremban District

Pantai is a mukim and settlement in Seremban District, Negeri Sembilan, Malaysia. Pantai is the Malay word for "beach" even though Pantai is located inland. One theory suggests that there was a lot of sand which in a way looks like a beach. Pantai is linked by Jalan Jelebu Federal Route 86 which links Pantai to Seremban and Kuala Klawang. Pantai is also connected to N30 which links Pantai to Lenggeng. Jalan Sikamat N38 links Pantai to Sikamat.
