= Pertang =

Mukim in Jelebu, Negeri Sembilan, Malaysia

Pertang Poghotang (Negeri Sembilan Malay)
- Mukim
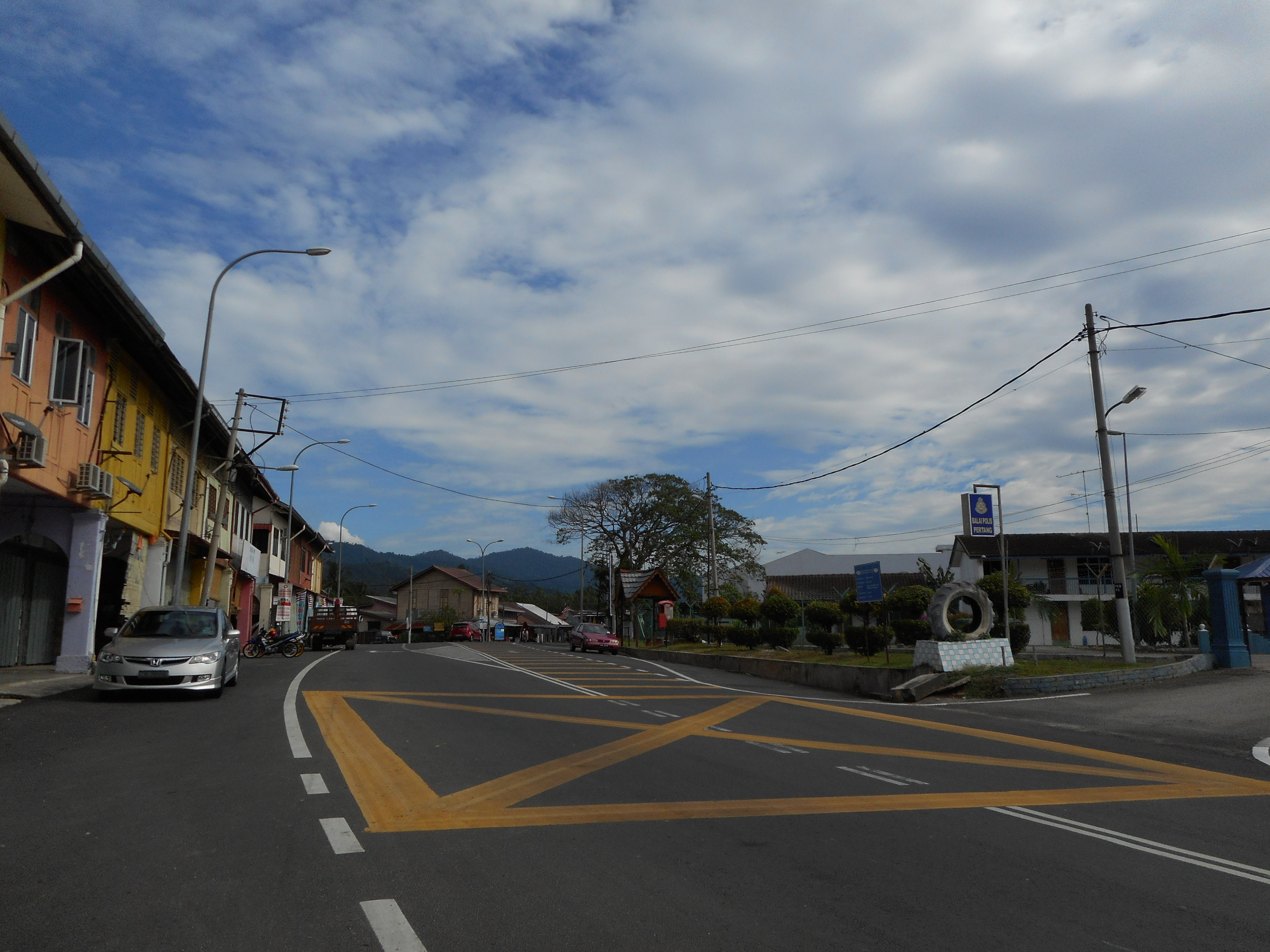

- Pertang in Jelebu District
- Country: Malaysia
- State: Negeri Sembilan
- District: Jelebu
- Luak: Jelebu

Government
  - Body: Jelebu District Council
  - President: Mohamad Syahanaz Mustapah
  - MP: Jalaluddin Alias (BN–UMNO)
  - MLA: Jalaluddin Alias (BN–UMNO)
- Time zone: UTC +8 (MST)
- Postcode: 72xxx

Pertang (Negeri Sembilan Malay: Poghotang) is a mukim in Jelebu District, Negeri Sembilan, Malaysia. Simpang Pertang is located near the town. Near Pertang there is also a village named Jelebu Estate that is about 5 km away. The new village Titi is another 5 km away.
