= Jelebu District =

District in Negeri Sembilan, Malaysia

Jelebu District Jolobu (Negeri Sembilan Malay)
- District of Negeri Sembilan
- Daerah Jelebu
- Seal
- Interactive map of Jelebu District
- Location of Jelebu District in Malaysia
- Coordinates: 3°0′N 102°05′E
- Country: Malaysia
- State: Negeri Sembilan
- Seat: Kuala Klawang
- Local area government: Jelebu District Council

Government
  - District officer: Syahrunizam Shahwan

Area
  - Total: 1,349.89 km^{2} (521.20 sq mi)

Population (2010)
  - Total: 37,287
  - Density: 27.622/km^{2} (71.541/sq mi)
- Time zone: UTC+8 (MST)
  - Summer (DST): UTC+8 (Not observed)
- Postcode: 71600 - 71650
- Calling code: +6-06
- Vehicle registration plates: N

Jelebu District Council Majlis Daerah Jelebu

Type
- Type: Local authority

History
- Founded: 28 August 1980

Leadership
- President: Mohamad Syahanaz Mustapah

Meeting place
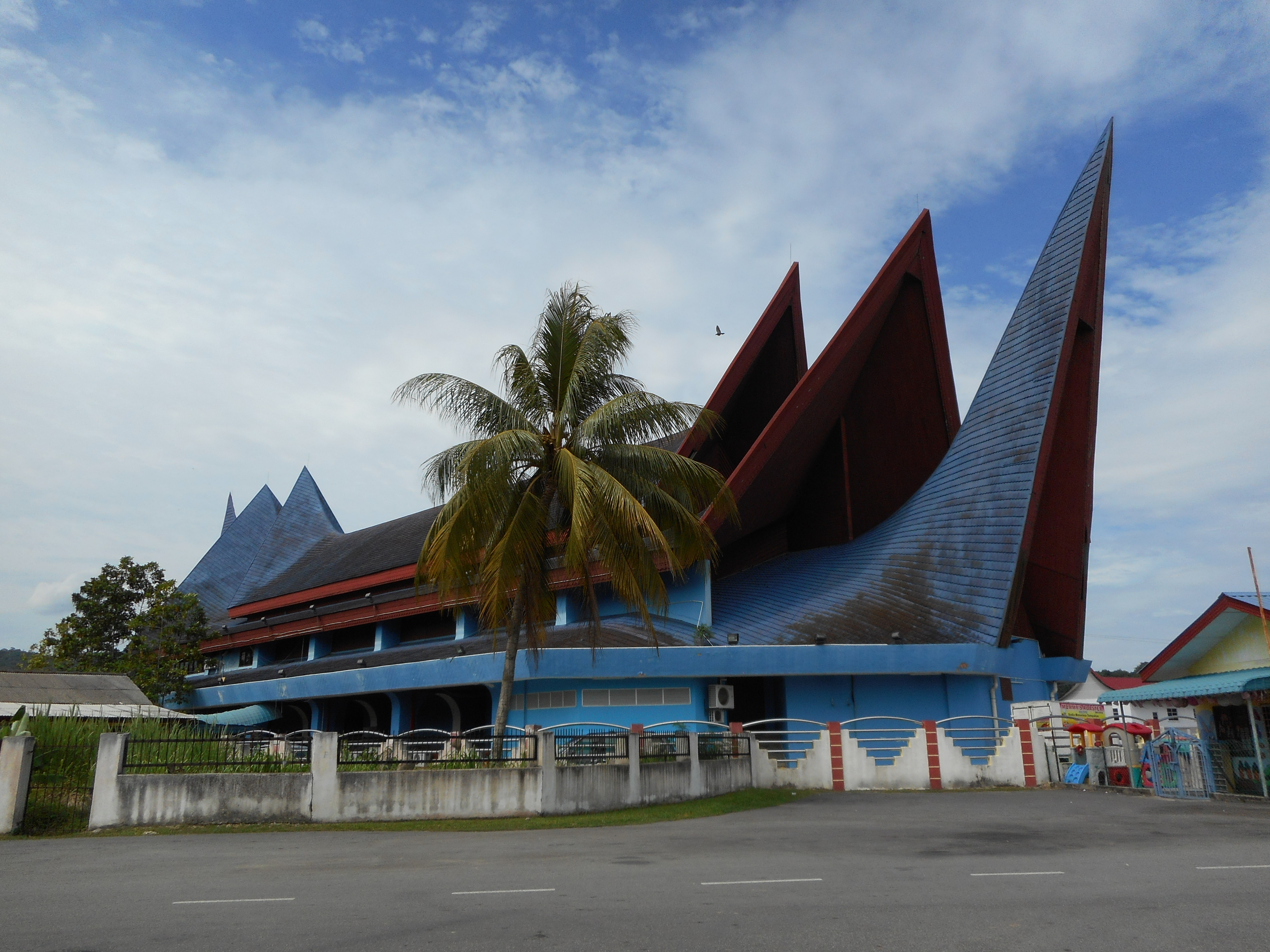
- Wisma MDJ, Jalan Simpang Pertang, 71600 Kuala Klawang, Jelebu, Negeri Sembilan.

Website
- www.mdjelebu.gov.my

Jelebu
- Luak Berundang
- Luak Jelebu
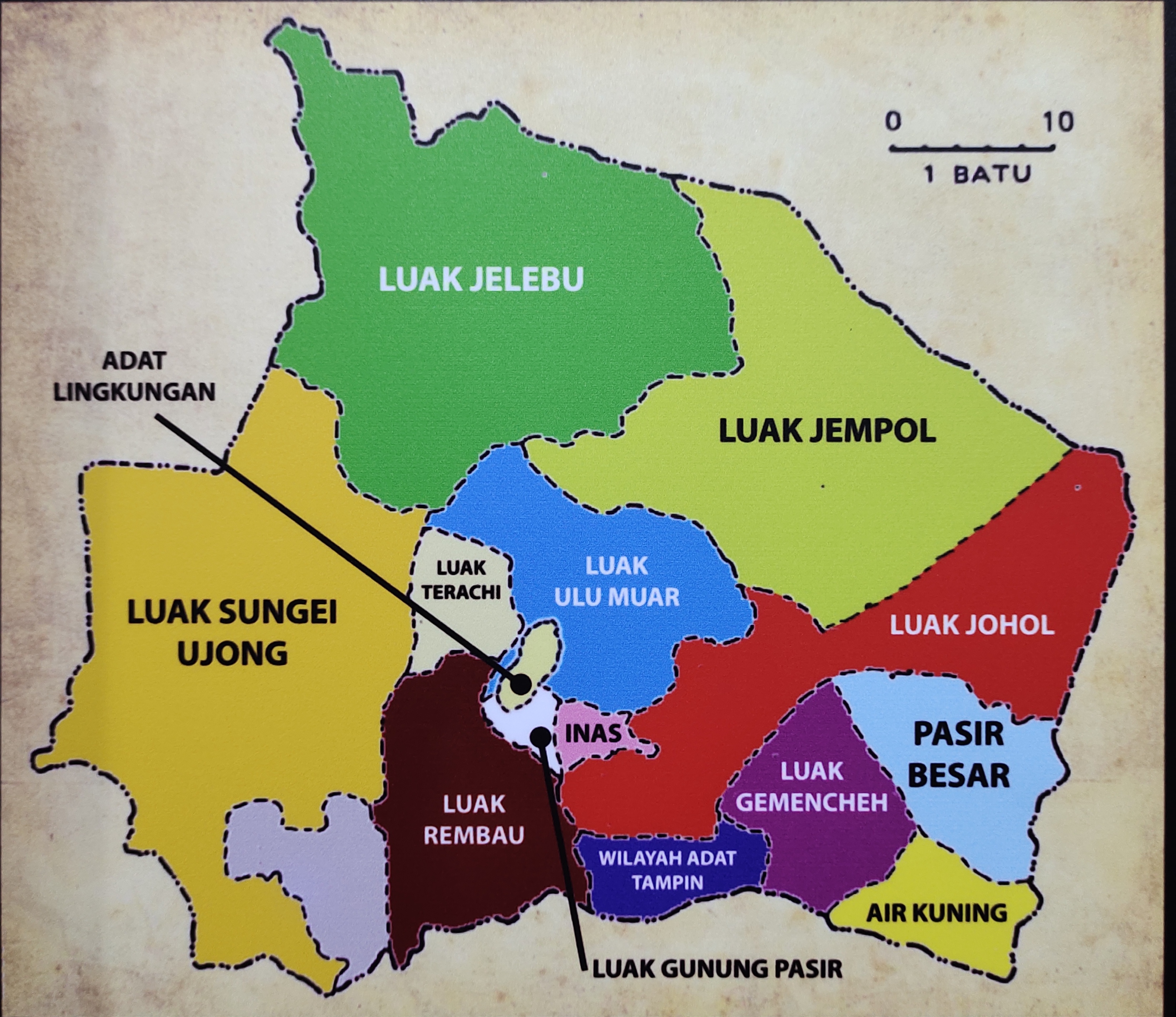
- Luak of ‍Jelebu relative to other luaks in Negeri Sembilan
- Country: Malaysia
- State: Negeri Sembilan
- Adat institution: Undang of Jelebu

Government
  - Undang: Azrin Khairi (disputed)

The Jelebu District (Negeri Sembilan Malay: Jolobu) is the second largest district in Negeri Sembilan, Malaysia after Jempol, with a population over 40,000. Jelebu borders on the Seremban District to its west and Kuala Pilah District to its south, Jempol District to its southeast, Bentong and Bera Districts, Pahang to its east and Hulu Langat District, Selangor to the north. Jelebu is a rural district with blossoming semi-agricultural industry. Jelebu is also a parliamentary constituency of the Dewan Rakyat in the Malaysian Parliament. Kuala Klawang is the principal town of the district.

Jelebu has an infamous recorded history of British and Japanese colonization as compared to other parts of Negeri Sembilan. Numerous priceless colonial artefacts were discovered in the small semi-agricultural town of Sungai Muntoh, which was once a prosperous mining town a century ago. These artefacts are now displayed in the state museum. Titi and neighbouring Sungai Muntoh were the most developed towns of all mining sites in Jelebu. The booming tin industry was one of the main reasons for the massacre in Titi, where more than 1,500 people, mainly Chinese, were killed. Altogether, about 5,000 people were killed by the Japanese-led army during World War II.

== Geography and climate ==
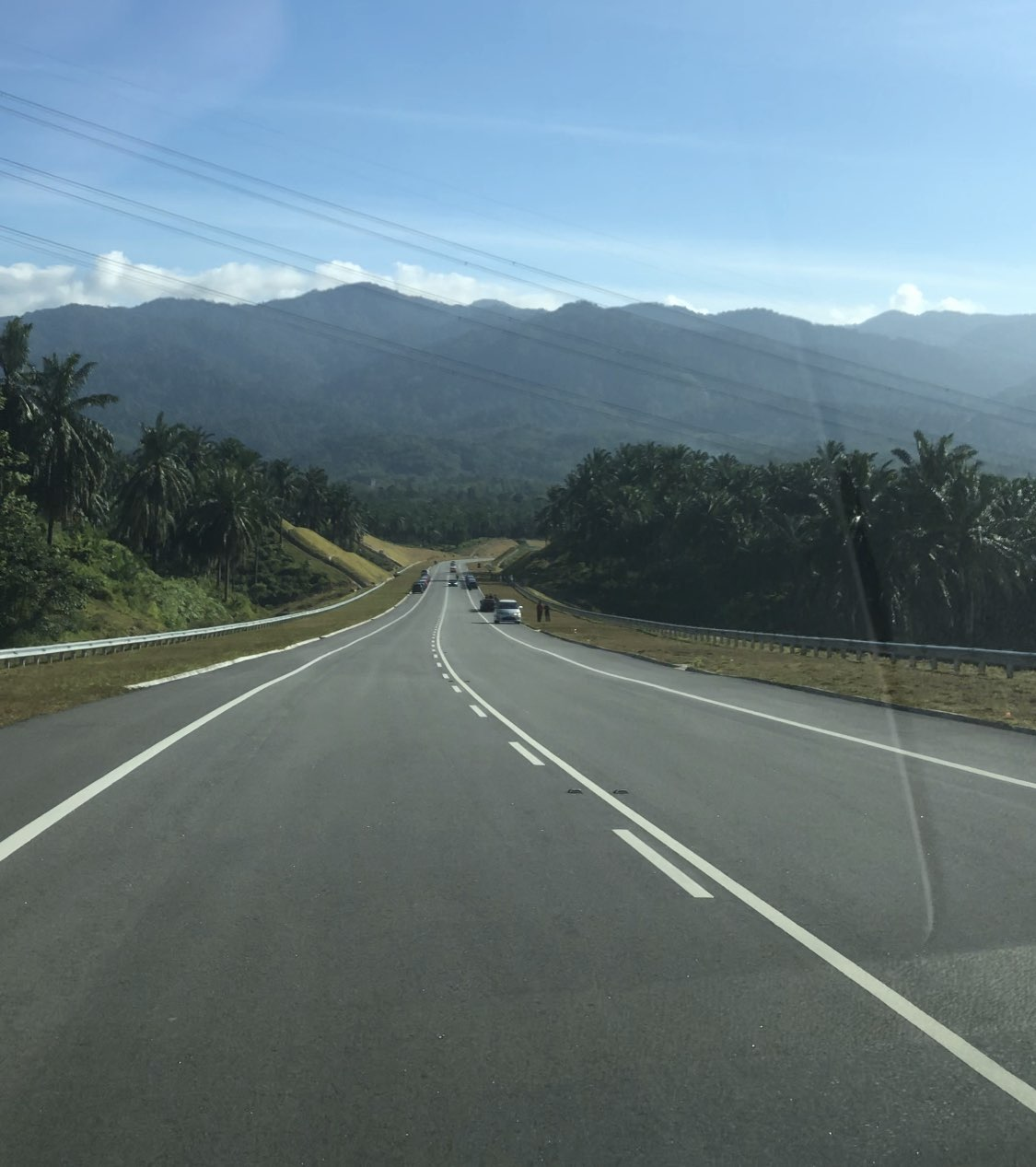
A section of the Negri Titiwangsa along the border between Jelebu and Seremban districts. Included in this stretch are the third and fourth tallest mountains in Negeri Sembilan, Mts. Telapak Buruk and Berembun

Amongst the seven districts of Negeri Sembilan, Jelebu is the most mountainous topographically as the Titiwangsa Mountains, the longest mountain range in Malaysia, transverses through the district. As a result, most of its terrain are dominated by forested undulating hills and mountain peaks. The Titiwangsa Mountains open up into a 77 km^{2} (30 sq mi) wide intermontane basin encompassing the central part of the district, of which major settlements like Kuala Klawang and Titi are situated in. The eastern and southern parts of the district are relatively flat, where agriculture flourished. Jelebu District is home to Negeri Sembilan's tallest mountain, Mount Besar Hantu (1,462 m), near the border with Pahang. The other significant peak within the district is Mount Telapak Buruk (1,193 m) on the border with Seremban District. The Pasoh Caves, the southernmost limestone cave complex in Malaysia, is also located in Jelebu. The Pasoh Caves are also known for being the first Paleolithic site in southern Peninsular Malaysia, as well as the southernmost in Malaysia.

Jelebu has the warmest climate recorded in Malaysian history. The southwestern part of Jelebu is considered as the driest place in Malaysia. However, in the mornings the temperatures are quite low and visibility is moderate due to the foggy climate.

== Administrative divisions ==

Jelebu District is divided into 8 mukims, which are:

- Glami Lemi
- Kenaboi
- Kuala Klawang (Capital)
- Peradong
- Pertang
- Triang Hilir
- Ulu Klawang
- Ulu Triang

== Demographics ==
Historical population
Year	Pop.	±%
1991	40,012	—
2000	37,194	−7.0%
2010	38,299	+3.0%
2020	46,026	+20.2%

== Economy ==
The rubber and mining business made Malaya as one of the richest in natural resources during the British colonial period. Jelebu was one such district that produced some of the world's best quality rubber and steel. Pineapple production there is ranked one of the top in Peninsular Malaysia. For some unknown reasons, Jelebu is home to some of the state's biggest and most advanced rehabilitation centres.

== Politics ==
Currently Jelebu constituency is represented in the Dewan Rakyat by Dato' Jalaluddin Alias of UMNO, the leading party of the Barisan Nasional coalition.

In turn, Jelebu contributes 4 seats to the Negeri Sembilan State Legislative Assembly:

- Chennah;
- Kuala Klawang;
- Pertang; and
- Sungai Lui.

Sungai Lui constituency is part of Jelebu parliamentary constituency but in district administration, it was part of the Jempol District and therefore in the local government level it was administered by the Jempol District Council (Malay: Majlis Daerah Jempol), which was formed on 28 August 1980 through the merger of the Kuala Klawang Town Board (Malay: Lembaga Bandaran Kuala Klawang) and the local councils (Malay: Majlis Tempatan) of Titi and Pertang.

== Federal Parliament and State Assembly Seats ==
List of Jelebu district representatives in the Federal Parliament (Dewan Rakyat)

Parliament	Seat Name	Member of Parliament	Party
P126	Jelebu	Jalaluddin Alias	Barisan Nasional (UMNO)

List of Jelebu district representatives in the State Legislative Assembly (Dewan Undangan Negeri)

Parliament	State	Seat Name	State Assemblyman	Party
P126	N1	Chennah	Siow Kong Choon	Barisan Nasional (MCA)
P126	N2	Pertang	Jalaluddin Alias	Barisan Nasional (UMNO)
P126	N4	Klawang	Danni Rais	Perikatan Nasional (WAWASAN)

== Tourist attractions ==
- Customs Museum (Malay: Muzium Adat) is a museum in Kuala Klawang which exhibits facets and lifestyle of the Malaysian people and identity of Negeri Sembilan. It was constructed in 2005 and officially opened on 2 February 2008 by Negeri Sembilan Chief Minister Mohamad Hasan and Minister for Culture, Arts and Heritage Rais Yatim. The museum is housed in a four-story building, with a giant replica of Malay headdress at the top of its entrance and consists of four galleries, which are: Introduction of custom, Life cycle, Intellectual tradition, government and power and Pepatih customs.
- Kuala Klawang Memorial or Martin Lister Memorial is a memorial in Kuala Klawang built to honouring Queen Victoria's Diamond Jubilee.

== Gallery ==
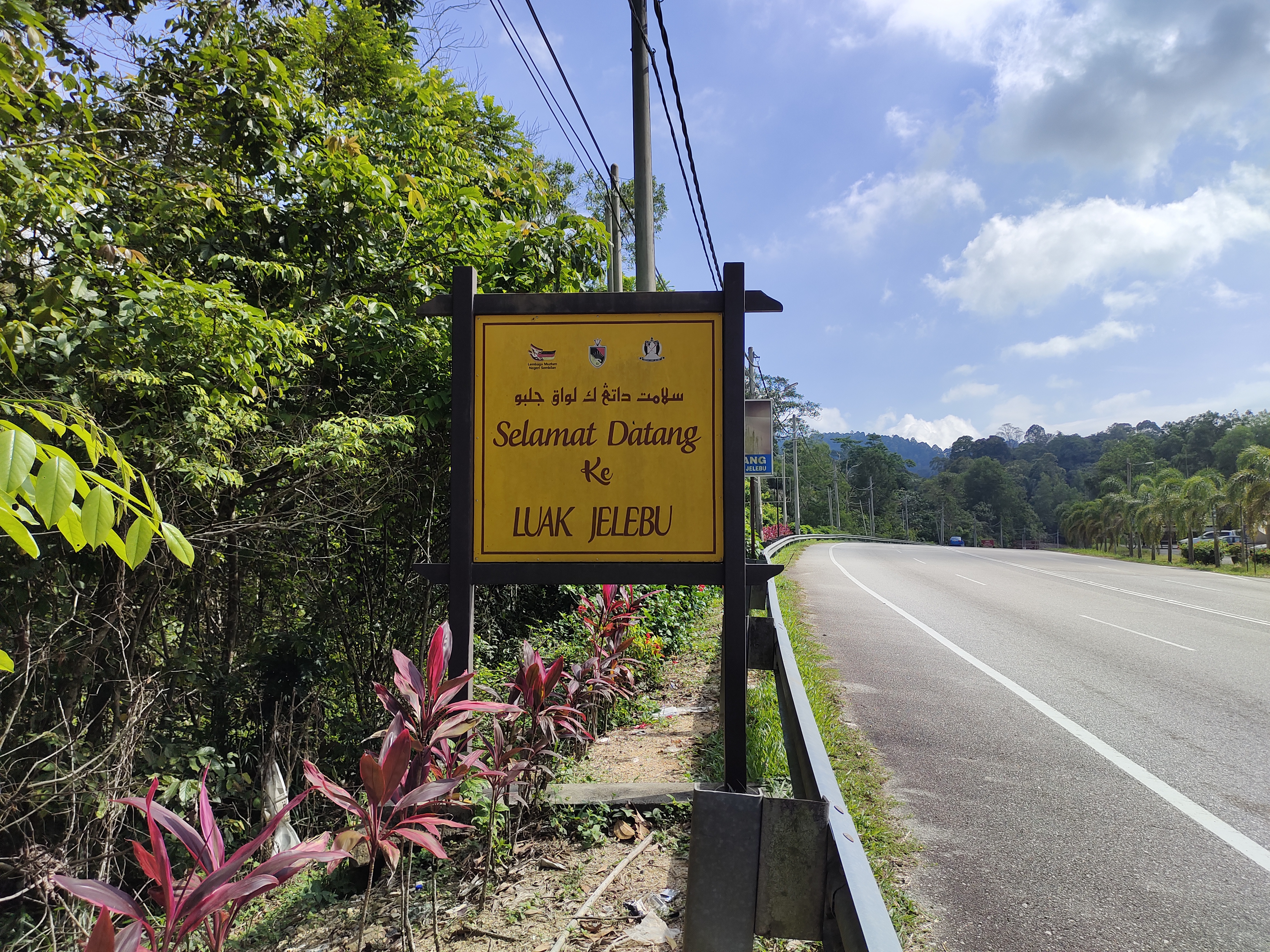
Boundary between the luaks of Sungai Ujong and Jelebu along Federal Route FT 86

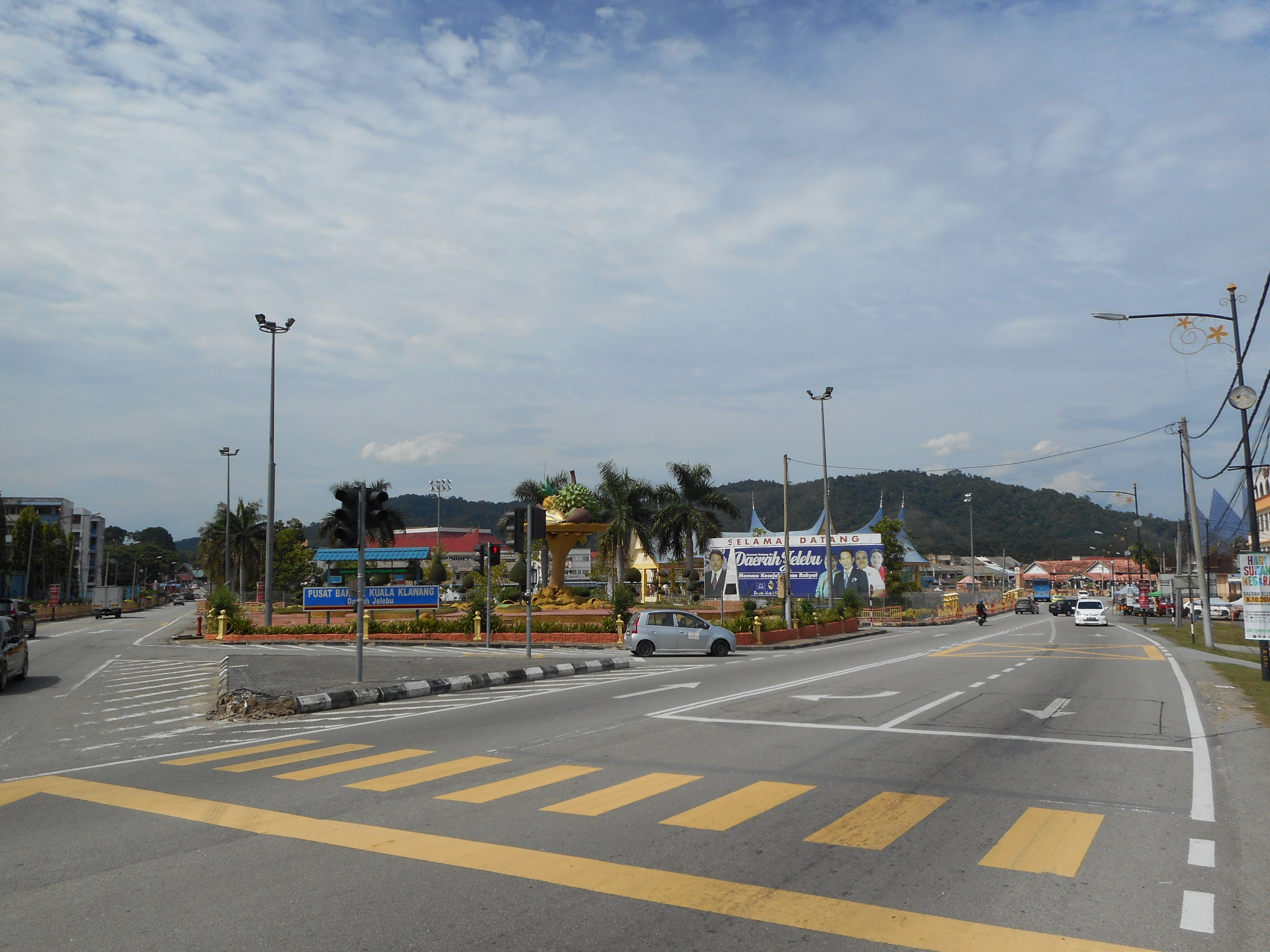
Kuala Klawang

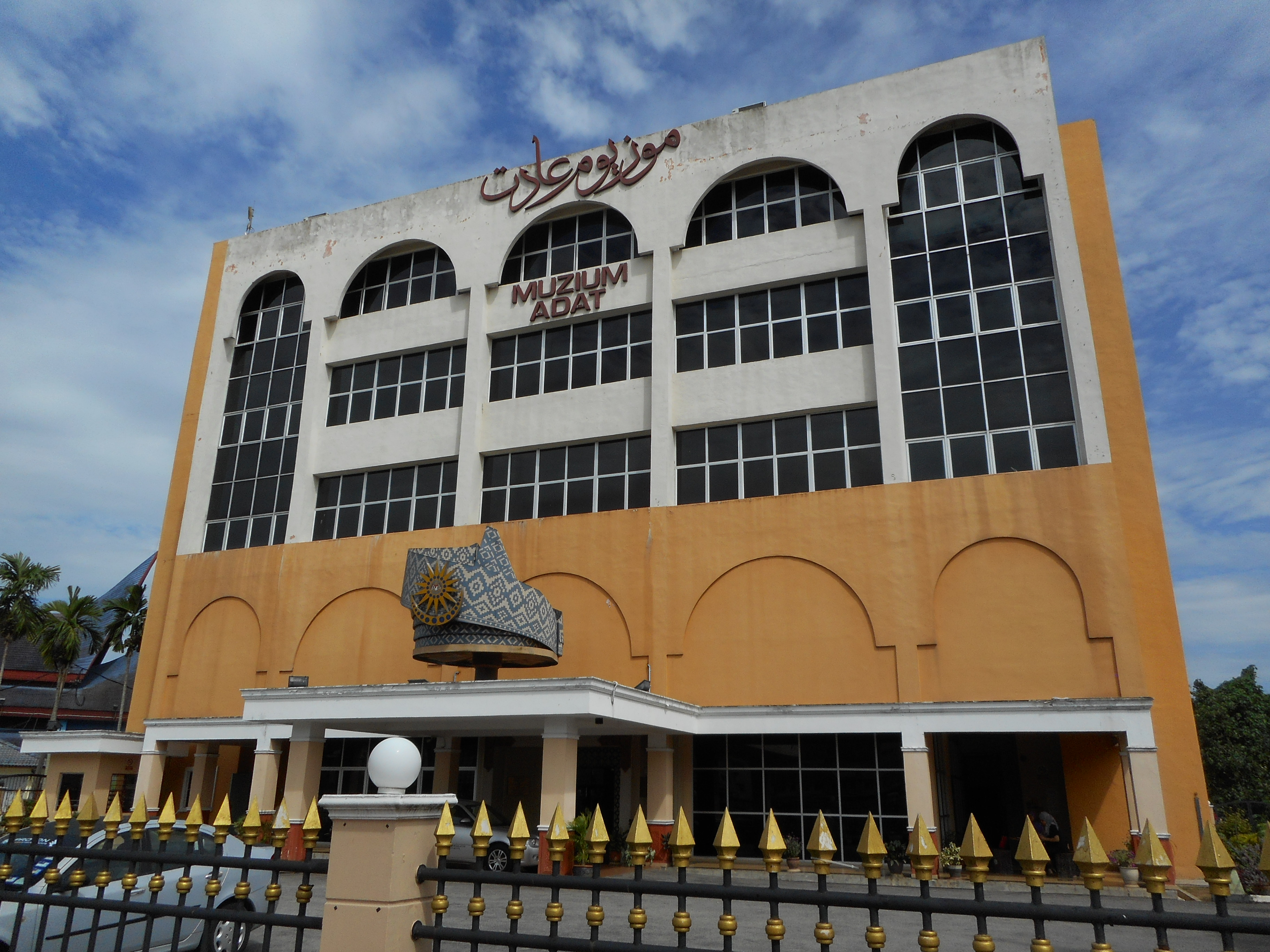
Custom Museum, Kuala Klawang

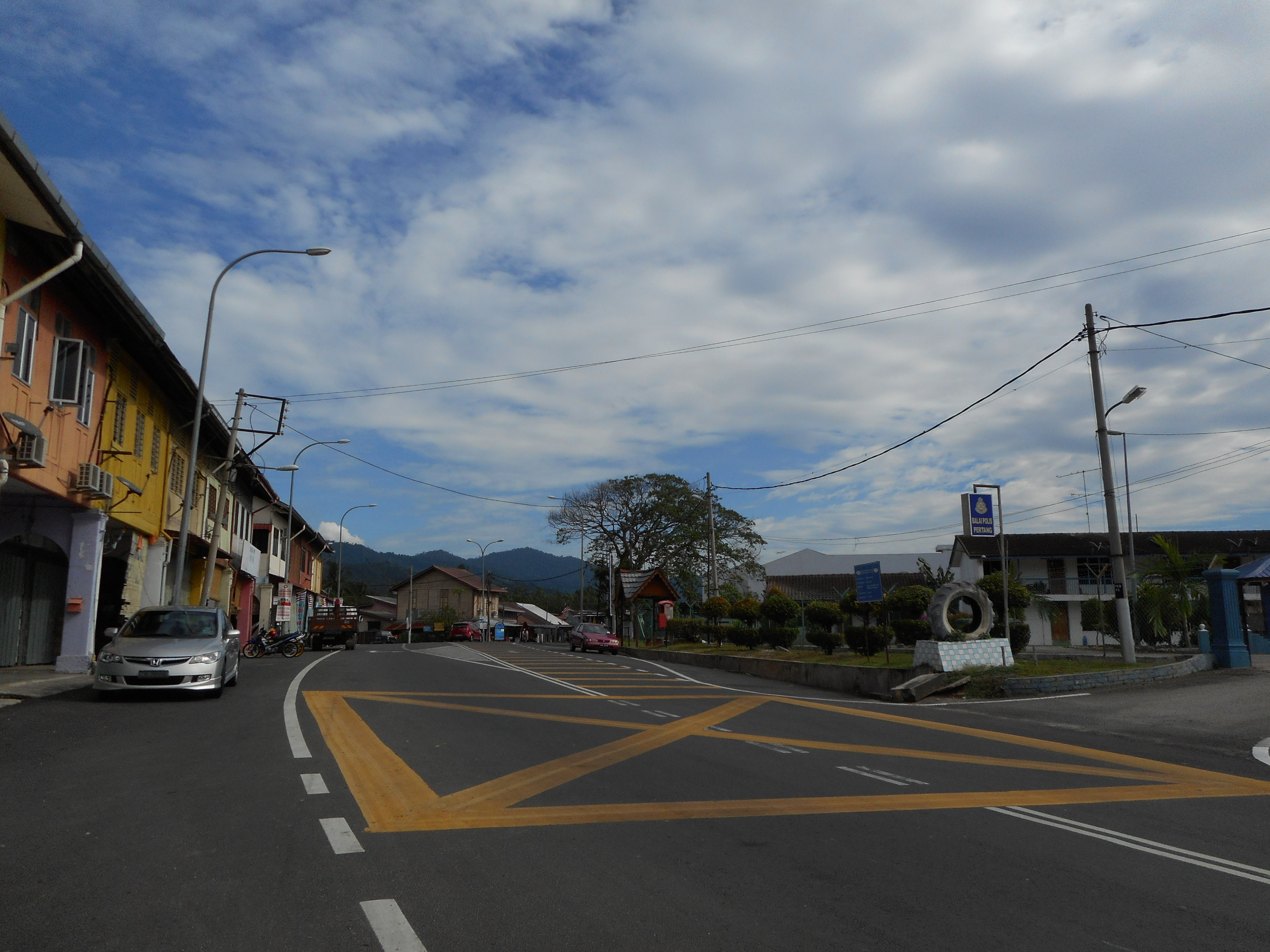
Pertang

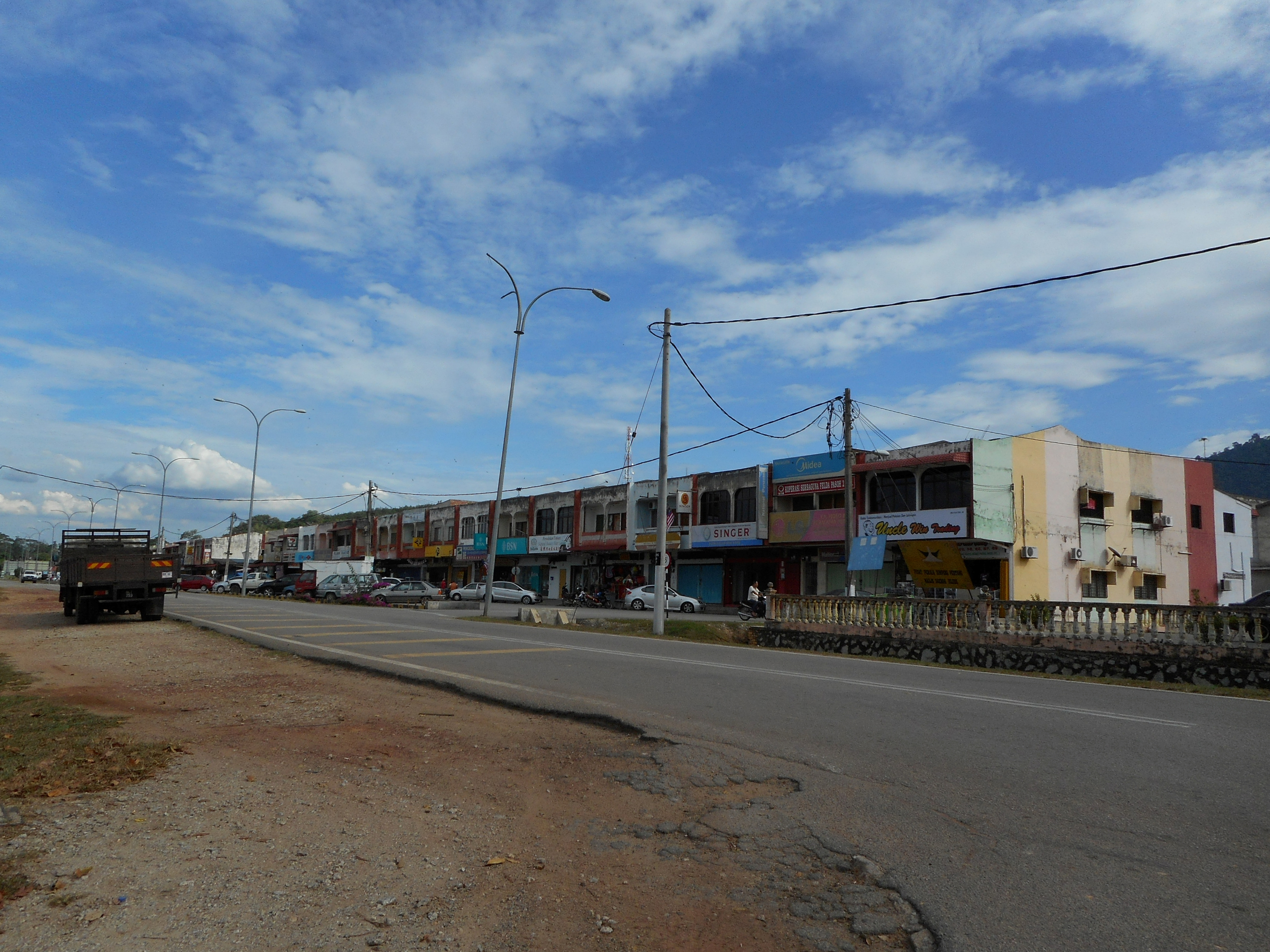
Simpang Pertang

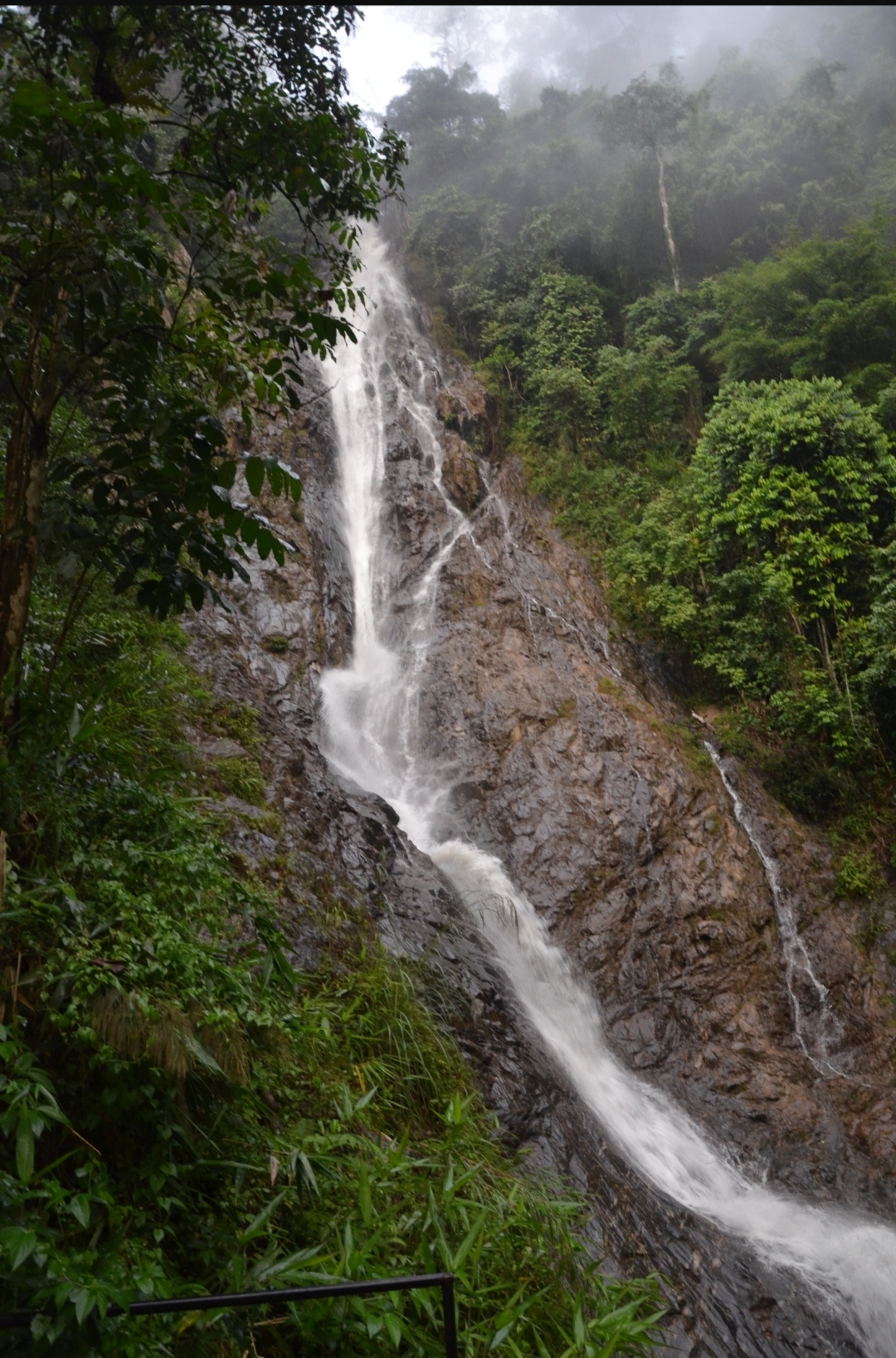
Lata Kijang waterfall, Kenaboi

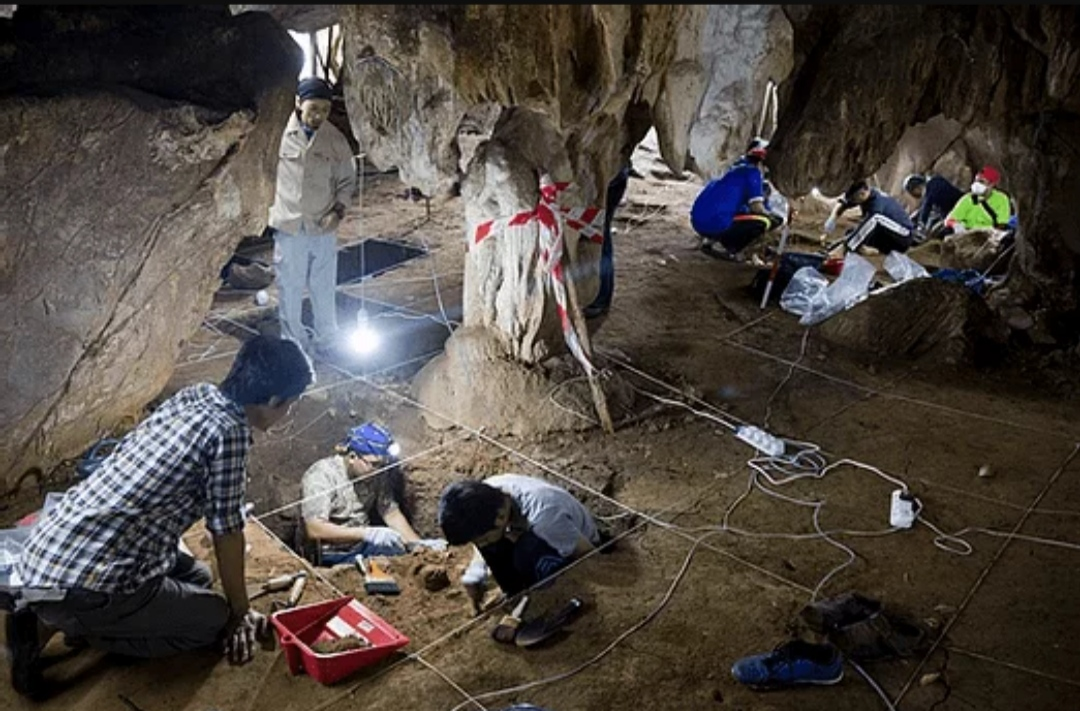
Excavation works in Gua Pelangi, Pasoh Caves

== See also ==
- Districts of Malaysia
