= Kajang–Seremban Highway =

Interstate highway in Malaysia

Coordinates: 2°48′35.2″N 101°54′24″E

Expressway 21
- Kajang–Seremban Highway (Lekas Highway)
- LEKAS in red

Route information
- Maintained by Lebuhraya Kajang-Seremban Sdn. Bhd. (Lekas)
- Length: 44.3 km (27.5 mi)
- Existed: 2002–present
- History: Completed in 2009

Major junctions
- North end: Kajang Perdana Interchange; Kajang, Selangor
- Kajang Bypass; Kajang Dispersal Link Expressway; FT 1 Federal Route 1 FT 31 Jalan Banting–Semenyih; FT 3265 Jalan Nilai–Pajam; FT 86 Federal Route 86; FT 51 Federal Route 51; FT 242 Persiaran Senawang 1
- South end: Paroi Interchange; Paroi, Negeri Sembilan

Location
- Country: Malaysia
- Primary destinations: Kuala Lumpur, Cheras, Kajang, Semenyih, Pajam, Nilai, Mantin, Temiang, Kuala Klawang, Seremban City Centre, Ampangan, Senawang

Highway system
- Highways in Malaysia; Expressways; Federal; State

The E21 Kajang–Seremban Highway, commonly known as the KASEH Highway (or LEKAS, from Lebuhraya Kajang–Seremban), is a Malaysian expressway linking Kajang in Selangor to Seremban in Negeri Sembilan.

Speed limits vary along the route. Most sections permit speeds of up to 110 km/h (68 mph), while certain stretches, such as those between Setul and Paroi, are restricted to 80 km/h (50 mph).

== Overview ==
The Kajang–Seremban Highway has a total length of 44.3 km (27.5 mi). It passes through several Malaysian towns, such as Semenyih, Pajam, Mantin, and Temiang and also connects to the Seremban Inner Ring Road. The highway redistributes traffic flow from other heavily congested expressways, including the North–South Expressway Southern Route and the Kuala Lumpur–Seremban Expressway.

The highway project has progressed through multiple stages of completion:

- Package 1A: SILK Interchange to Kajang South – completed and opened to the public.
- Package 1B: Kajang South Interchange to Pajam Interchange – earthworks and major drainage completed.
- Packages 2A and 3: Pajam Interchange to Paroi – land acquisitions completed; a segment between Mantin and Setul Interchanges approved for realignment.

== Route background ==
The kilometer zero of the expressway starts from Exit 1804 of the Kajang Perdana Interchange, which connects the expressway to the E18 Kajang Dispersal Link Expressway and the Kajang Bypass near Kajang, Selangor.

== History ==
The LEKAS Highway project was approved by the Malaysian government in 1997. Construction started in 2002 but faced delays due to financial challenges encountered by the original concessionaire, Kajang–Seremban Highway Sdn. Bhd. (KASEH). In November 2006, the project resumed under a new concessionaire, Lebuhraya Kajang-Seremban Sdn. Bhd. (LEKAS), a joint venture between IJM Corporation Berhad and KASEH with a 50% stake held by each. It was scheduled to be completed by December 2009.

Phase 1 of the expressway, which connects Kajang South to Pajam, was opened on 23 August 2008. The main subcontractor was WCT, which then subcontracted the beam manufacturing to Mudajaya. To allow motorists to familiarize themselves with the expressway, it operated toll-free for a month.

The expressway system was extended with the opening of Mantin toll plaza on 31 December 2008. The extended route remained toll-free until 30 January 2009.

On 1 March 2010, the Setul and Ampangan interchanges opened for traffic.

== Features ==
- Six-lane carriageway from Kajang to Setul; four-lane carriageway from Setul to Paroi (Ampangan Interchange to Linggi River bridge - six-lane)
- Medium to high-speed limits of 80 km/h (Kajang Perdana–Kajang South and Setul–Paroi) and 110 km/h (all other sections)
- An SOS emergency phone
- The Setul toll plaza, which is the highest toll plaza in Malaysia, located 258 meters above sea level atop Gunung Mantin-Seremban

== Notable events ==
=== Pajam incident ===
On the night of 27 September 2007, at about 11:45 p.m., eight large concrete beams, each weighing close to 70 metric tonnes (around 77 short tons), collapsed at a construction site near the Pajam Interchange on the Kajang–Seremban Highway. The site was about 1 kilometre (0.6 miles) from the interchange. No one was injured in the incident.

In the months that followed, the contractor built a temporary public bypass road, about 4 kilometres (2.5 miles) long, so traffic could continue to move around the construction area. The bypass linked Federal Route FT3265 to the Pajam Interchange, passed through the Pajam Toll Plaza, and rejoined the same route closer to the town of Nilai. The collapsed beams were later rebuilt and installed. All repair costs were covered by the contractor, and no public funds were used.

The affected section of road is now open to traffic and forms part of the LEKAS Highway.

=== Other events ===
On 17 April 2010, Achik Spin, a singer with the Malaysian rock band Spin, died in a car accident on the Kajang–Seremban Highway near Pajam, Negeri Sembilan.

On 3 May 2020, at about 2:11 a.m., Corporal Safwan Muhammad Ismail, aged 31, died after his vehicle collided with a police COVID-19 roadblock near the Kajang Selatan toll plaza.

== Toll systems ==
As part of an initiative to facilitate faster transactions at all toll plazas, all toll transactions on the Kajang–Seremban Highway have been conducted electronically via Touch 'n Go cards or SmartTAG since 2 March 2016. This is the first closed toll expressway to phase out of the closed toll system.

=== Toll rates ===
(Since 1 January 2023)

==== Between Kajang South and Setul toll plazas ====
Class	Type of vehicles	Rate (in Malaysian Ringgit (RM)) up to
0	Motorcycles (vehicles with two axles and two wheels)	Free
1	Private cars (Vehicles with two axles and 3 or 4 wheels, excluding taxis and buses)	5.50
2	Vans and other small freight vehicles (Vehicles with two axles and 5 or 6 wheels, excluding buses)	8.25
3	Large trucks (Vehicles with 3 or more axles, excluding buses)	11.00
4	Taxis	2.75
5	Buses	3.69

==== Ampangan toll plaza ====
Class	Type of vehicles	Rate (in Malaysian Ringgit (RM))
0	Motorcycles (vehicles with two axles and two wheels)	Free
1	Private cars (vehicles with two axles and three or four wheels (excluding taxis and buses))	2.30
2	Vans and other small goods vehicles (vehicles with two axles and five or six wheels (excluding buses))	3.50
3	Large trucks (vehicles with three or more axles (excluding buses))	4.70
4	Taxis	1.20
5	Buses	1.50

== Interchanges lists ==
Legend:

- I/C - Interchange, I/S - Intersection, RSA - Rest and service area, OBR - Overhead bridge restaurant, R/R - Restaurant and rest plaza, L/B - Layby, V/P - Vista point, TN - tunnel, T/P - Toll plaza, BR - Bridge
- C - Cloverleaf, S - Stack, T-A - Trumpet-A, T-B - Trumpet-B, DT - Directional-T/Y, SDT - Semi-Directional-T/Y, P-Y - Partial-Y, D - Diamond, P-C - Partial cloverleaf, D-D - Diverging diamond, D-R - Direct ramp

State	District	Location	km	mi	Exit	Name	Destinations	Notes
Selangor	Hulu Langat	Kajang	0.0	0.0	Through to Kajang Bypass			
Selangor	Hulu Langat	Kajang	0.0	0.0	1804	Kajang Perdana I/C	Kajang Dispersal Link Expressway – Sungai Long, Balakong, Sungai Besi, Seri Kembangan, Kuala Lumpur, Seremban, Johor Bahru, Putrajaya, Cyberjaya, Kuala Lumpur International Airport (KLIA)	Cloverleaf interchange
Selangor	Hulu Langat	Kajang			2101	Kajang South I/C	FT 1 Malaysia Federal Route 1 – Kajang city centre, Rinching, Semenyih	Full cloverleaf interchange
Selangor	Hulu Langat	Kajang			Kajang South Toll Plaza			
Selangor	Hulu Langat	Semenyih			2102	Semenyih I/C	FT 31 Malaysia Federal Route 31 – Semenyih, Beranang, Bangi, Dengkil, Setia EcoHill, Banting	Trumpet interchange
Selangor	Hulu Langat	Semenyih			Sungai Semenyih bridge			
Selangor	Hulu Langat	Semenyih			Sungai Rinching bridge			
Selangor	Hulu Langat	Semenyih			Sungai Kembong bridge			
Selangor	Hulu Langat	Beranang			2102A	Eco Majestic I/C	Unnamed road – Eco Majestic, Beranang	Trumpet interchange
Selangor	Hulu Langat	Beranang			Sungai Beranang bridge			
Selangor	Hulu Langat	Beranang			Beranang RSA (both bounds; separated)			
Negeri Sembilan	Seremban	Batang Benar			Sungai Batang Benar bridge			
Negeri Sembilan	Seremban	Batang Benar			2103	Pajam I/C	FT 3265 Malaysia Federal Route 3265 – Pajam, Nilai, Sepang, Kuala Lumpur International Airport (KLIA); North–South Expressway Southern Route / AH2 – Kuala Lumpur, Johor Bahru	Trumpet interchange
Negeri Sembilan	Seremban	Mantin			Sungai Pajam bridge			
Negeri Sembilan	Seremban	Mantin			2104	Mantin I/C	FT 1 Malaysia Federal Route 1 – Mantin, Lenggeng	Trumpet interchange
Negeri Sembilan	Seremban	Setul			Sungai Bangkung bridge 230 m above sea level			
Negeri Sembilan	Seremban	Setul			Setul Toll Plaza; 258 m above sea level/Highest toll plaza in Malaysia			
Negeri Sembilan	Seremban	Setul			Setul viaduct 250 m above sea level			
Negeri Sembilan	Seremban	Setul			2105	Setul I/C; 248 m above sea level	FT 1 Malaysia Federal Route 1 – Seremban city centre, Port Dickson	Directional-T interchange
Negeri Sembilan	Seremban	Temiang			2105A	Ulu Temiang I/C; 247 m above sea level	FT 366 Malaysia Federal Route 366 – Seremban city centre, Temiang, Pantai	Directional-T interchange Ampangan bound entrance only
Negeri Sembilan	Seremban	Temiang			Sungai Temiang bridge 241 m above sea level			
Negeri Sembilan	Seremban	Ampangan			Ampangan Toll Plaza			
Negeri Sembilan	Seremban	Ampangan			2106	Ampangan I/C	FT 86 Malaysia Federal Route 86 – Seremban city centre, Ampangan, Kuala Klawang	Parclo interchange
Negeri Sembilan	Seremban	Ampangan			Sungai Linggi bridge			
Negeri Sembilan	Seremban	Ampangan				Taman Ampangan	Taman Ampangan, Taman Bukit Ampangan, Taman Margosa	LILO junctions Both bounds
Negeri Sembilan	Seremban	Paroi	44.3	27.5	2107	Paroi I/C	FT 51 Malaysia Federal Route 51 – Seremban City Centre, Paroi, Kuala Pilah, Seri Menanti, Ulu Bendol Recreational Forest, Senawang	Multi-level stack interchange
Negeri Sembilan	Seremban	Paroi	44.3	27.5	Through to FT 242 Persiaran Senawang 1			
1.000 mi = 1.609 km; 1.000 km = 0.621 mi: Electronic toll collection; Incomplete access; Route transition
