= Kuala Klawang =

Town and district capital in Jelebu, Negeri Sembilan, Malaysia

Kuala Klawang Kolo Klawang (Negeri Sembilan Malay)
- Town and district capital
- Downtown Kuala Klawang, looking south

- Location within Malaysia
- Coordinates: 2°56′20″N 102°04′15″E
- Country: Malaysia
- State: Negeri Sembilan
- District: Jelebu
- Luak: Jelebu

Government
  - Body: Jelebu District Council
  - President: Mohamad Syahanaz Mustapah
  - MP: Jalaluddin Alias (BN–UMNO)
  - MLA: Danni Rais (PN–WAWASAN)
- Elevation: 126 m (413 ft)
- Time zone: UTC +8 (MST)
- Postcode: 71xxx

Kuala Klawang in Jelebu District

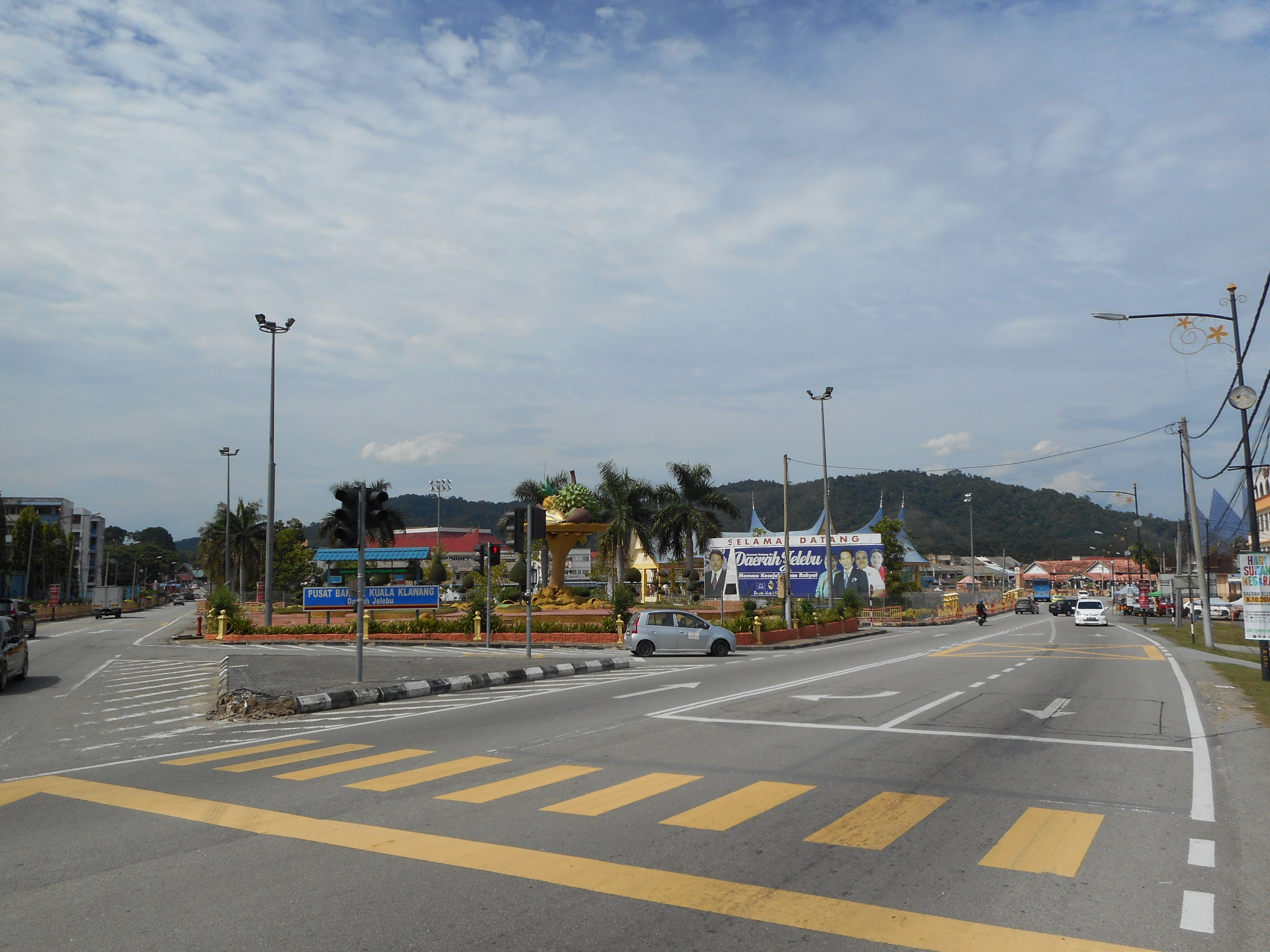
The intersection between routes FT86 (right) and N32 (left)

Kuala Klawang (Negeri Sembilan Malay: Kolo Klawang or Koklawang) is a mukim and the district capital of Jelebu District, Negeri Sembilan, Malaysia.

It is connected to the state capital, Seremban through Federal Route 86 as well as to Hulu Langat, Selangor and Kuala Lumpur via State Route N32.

== Tourist attractions ==
- Custom Museum
- Kuala Klawang Memorial
- Mausoleum of Moyang Salleh
- Kuala Dulang Mosque
- Jeram Toi Recreational Forest

== Gallery ==
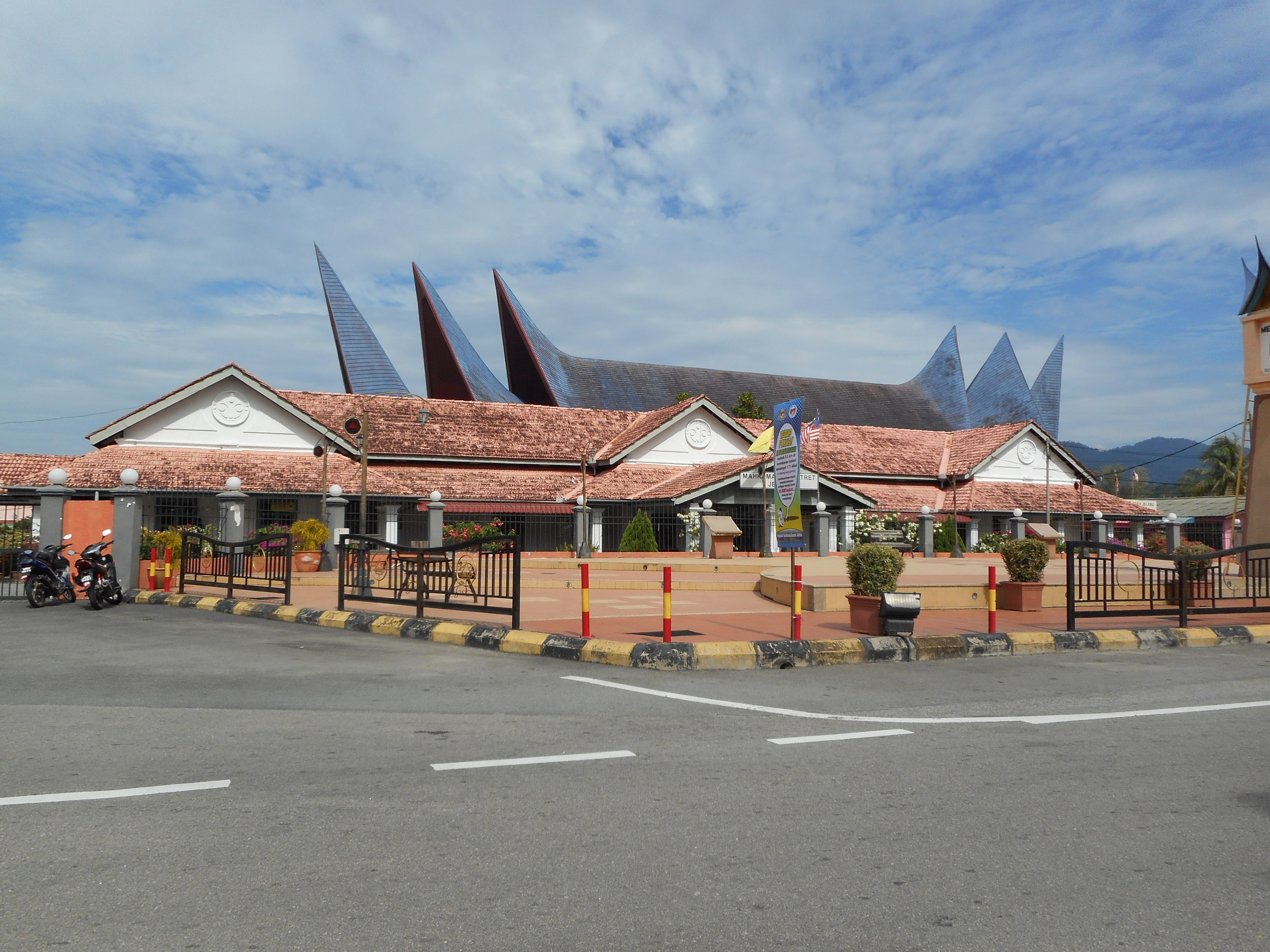
Jelebu Magistrates Court, with the District Council Building in the background

Jelebu Historical Trail at Bukit Undang, the town's Stadtberg

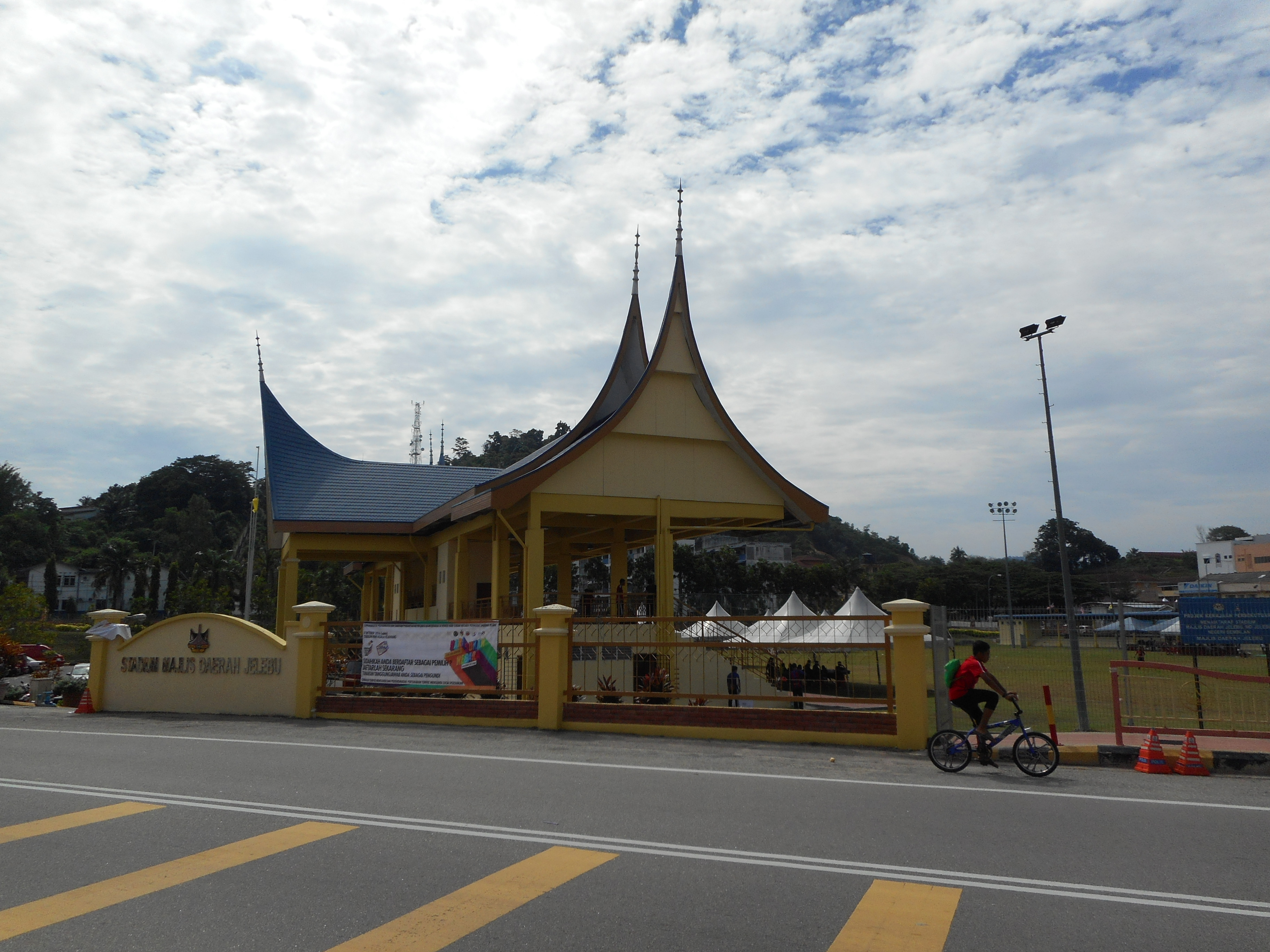
Jelebu District Council Stadium, with the grandstand exhibiting bagonjong-styled roof

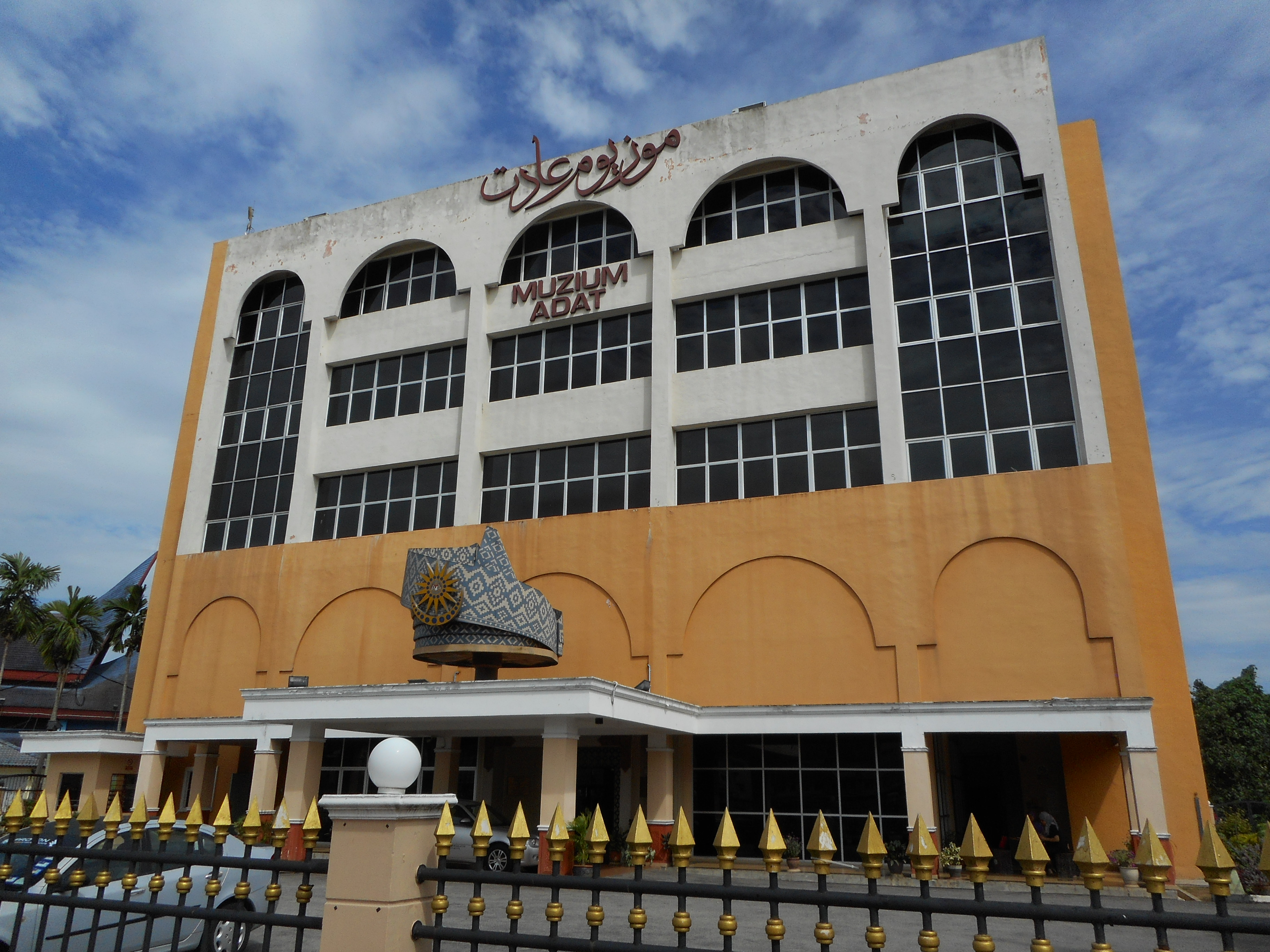
Custom Museum

Kuala Klawang Jamek Mosque

Clock tower, dating back to 1957

Kuala Klawang Bus Station
