= Nilai–Labu–Enstek Expressway =

Road in Malaysia

- Lebuhraya Nilai–Labu–Enstek 汝来–拉务–恩斯德大道

Route information
- Maintained by Malaysian Public Works Department
- Length: 18.0 km (11.2 mi)
- Existed: 2018–present
- History: Expected completion by July 2027
- Restrictions: 90 km/h (56 mph)

Major junctions
- Northeast end: Taman Semarak, Nilai
- FT 3265 Federal Route 3265; North–South Expressway Southern Route / AH2; FT 362 Federal Route 362; FT 195 Federal Route 195; FT 1266 Federal Route 1266
- Southwest end: Bandar Enstek

Location
- Country: Malaysia
- Primary destinations: Labu, Bandar Hamilton, MVV City, Bandar Sri Sendayan, Salak Tinggi, Kuala Lumpur International Airport

Highway system
- Highways in Malaysia; Expressways; Federal; State

The Nilai–Labu–Enstek Expressway (NLE, Malay: Lebuhraya Nilai–Labu–Enstek; Chinese: 汝来–拉务–恩斯德大道) is a non-tolled expressway under construction in Seremban District, Negeri Sembilan, Malaysia. The 18 km (11 mi) expressway will link Taman Semarak at Nilai to Kampung LBJ in Bandar Enstek through Labu.

The NLE is built as part of the Malaysia Vision Valley, an economic corridor that encompasses western Negeri Sembilan.

== Route description ==
The Nilai–Labu–Enstek Expressway start from Taman Semarak at Nilai to Kampung LBJ at Bandar Enstek. The expressway crossing several key industrial areas and developing areas, including Labu, Bandar Hamilton, MVV City and Bandar Enstek.

== History ==
On 5 November 2025, the federal government approved the proposal to build new interchange links from E2/AH2 North–South Expressway Southern Route to NLE Expressway.

The federal government approved the extra RM 225 million extra allocation and appointed the new contractor to continue the construction, which is expected to be completed in 2027.

== Features ==
The Nilai–Labu–Enstek Expressway comes with these features.

- 18 km (11 mi) four-lane dual carriageway

At most sections, the Nilai–Labu–Enstek Expressway was built under the JKR R5 road standard, allowing maximum speed limit of up to 90 kilometres per hour (56 mph).

== Junction list ==
The entire route is located in Seremban District, Negeri Sembilan.

Location	km	mi	Exit	Name	Destinations	Notes
Nilai				Nilai; Taman Semarak	FT 3265 Malaysia Federal Route 3265	
Nilai				NLE-NSE I/C	North–South Expressway Southern Route / AH2	Proposal has been approved on 5 November 2025
Nilai			Lamiar River bridge			
Labu				Labu	FT 362 Malaysia Federal Route 362	
Labu			Railway crossing bridge			
Labu			Batang Labu River bridge			
Bandar Enstek			Jijan River bridge			
Bandar Enstek				Bandar Enstek; Kampung LB Johnson	FT 1266 Malaysia Federal Route 1266; FT 195 Malaysia Federal Route 195	
1.000 mi = 1.609 km; 1.000 km = 0.621 mi: Proposed
