= List of schools in Negeri Sembilan =

This is a list of schools in Negeri Sembilan, Malaysia. It is categorised according to the variants of schools in Malaysia, and is arranged alphabetically.

== Chinese Independent High Schools ==
- Chung Hua High School Seremban (芙蓉中华中学)
- Chung Hua Middle School (波德申中华中学)

== Islamic religious schools ==
=== Secondary education: Sekolah Menengah Agama (SMA) ===
- Sekolah Menengah Agama Dato' Klana Petra Maamor
- Maahad Ahmadi, Gemencheh (previously known as Sekolah Agama Menengah Atas Dan Senawi - abbreviated SAMAS)
- Sheikh Haji Mohd Said Religious Institution (SMK (A) Sheikh Haji Mohd Said - also abbreviated SMKA SHAMS)
- Sekolah Menengah Agama Persekutuan Labu
- SMKA Dato' Haji Abu Hassan Haji Sail (SMKA Pedas), Rembau
- SMA Nilai, Nilai
- Sekolah Menengah Agama Teluk Kemang
- Sekolah Menenngah Agama Sains Kuala Pilah
- Institut Tahfiz Al-Quran Negeri Sembilan

== National schools ==
=== Primary education: Sekolah Kebangsaan (SK) ===
- SK Chembong
- SK Datuk Akhir Zaman, Rantau
- SK Jalan Tokong Setia
- SK Batang Benar, Mantin
- SK Desa Cempaka, Nilai
- SK Kota
- SK King George V
- SK Seri Kelana, Seremban
- SK Kuala Klawang
- SK Mantin
- SK Methodist (ACS)
- SK Nyatoh
- SK Panglima Adnan, Port Dickson
- SK Port Dickson
- SK Sungala
- SK Si Rusa
- SK Puteri
- SK Taman Tuanku Jaafar, Sg.Gadut
- SK Senawang
- SK Seri Pagi
- SK Taman Dusun Nyior
- SK Taman Tasik Jaya
- SK Taman Bandar Senawang
- SK Telok Kemang, Port dickson
- SK Sikamat
- SK Pilin
- Sekolah Kebangsaan Rahang, Seremban
- SK Seremban 2A
- SK lukut
- SK Wawasan
- SK Taman Rasah Jaya
- SK Kuala Pilah
- SK Dato' Bandar Rasah
- SK Desa Cempaka, Nilai
- SK Dato Idris
- SK Ampang Tinggi
- SK Talang, Tg Ipoh
- SK Undang Rembau, Rembau
- SK Men Sri Perpatih (Felda)
- SK Tunku Kurshiah
- SK Pasoh 2 (F)
- SK Seberang Batu Hampar, Rembau
- SK Seremban Jaya 1, Seremban
- SK Sungai Dua, Gemencheh
- SK Labu Ulu, Batu 8
- SK Desa Jasmin, Nilai
- SK Labu, Batu 10.
- SK Dato' Shahbandar Abu Bakar, Labu Hilir
- SK Dr. Sulaiman, Tampin
- SK Tunku Besar/Tunku Besar School, Tampin
- SK Tengku Zainun, Tampin (Previously SK Tampin)
- SK Taman Semarak, Nilai
- SK Taman Paroi Jaya
- SK PULAPAH/SEKOLAH KLUSTER KECERMELANGAN PULAPOL AIR HITAM

=== Secondary education: Sekolah Menengah Kebangsaan (SMK) ===
School code	School name	Postcode	Area	Coordinates
NEA6008	SMK (FELDA) Bandar Baru Serting	72120	Bandar Seri Jempol	2.8920°N 102.4057°E
NEA6006	SMK (FELDA) Lui Barat	72120	Bandar Seri Jempol	2.9556°N 102.3788°E
NEA6007	SMK (FELDA) Palong 7	73470	Gemas	2.8245°N 102.6710°E
NEA6005	SMK (FELDA) Palong Dua	73450	Gemas	2.7340°N 102.5860°E
NEA6002	SMK (FELDA) Pasoh 2	72300	Simpang Pertang	2.9434°N 102.3010°E
NEE4102	SMK (FELDA) Seri Sendayan	71950	Seremban	2.6708°N 101.8466°E
NEA6010	SMK Alam Beraja	73430	Gemas	2.7895°N 102.5773°E
NEA6001	SMK Bahau	72100	Bahau	2.7997°N 102.4130°E
NEA6012	SMK Bahau 2	72100	Bahau	2.8354°N 102.4083°E
NEA4120	SMK Bandar Baru Sri Sendayan	71950	Seremban	2.6628°N 101.8838°E
NEA4121	SMK Bandar Enstek	71760	Bandar Baru Enstek	2.7512°N 101.7682°E
NEE5039	SMK Bukit Jalor	73200	Gemencheh	2.5267°N 102.4880°E
NEA4112	SMK Bukit Kepayang	70300	Seremban	2.6805°N 101.9070°E
NEA4090	SMK Bukit Mewah	70100	Seremban	2.6942°N 101.9441°E
NEA5054	SMK Bukit Rokan	73200	Gemencheh	2.6076°N 102.3987°E
NEE2068	SMK Bukit Saujana	71050	Port Dickson	2.5041°N 101.8390°E
NEA1081	SMK Dangi	73100	Johol	2.6431°N 102.3200°E
NEB4097	SMK Dato Sheikh Ahmad	70400	Seremban	2.7382°N 101.9500°E
NEE1087	SMK Dato' Abdul Samad	71500	Tanjong Ipoh	2.7408°N 102.1830°E
NEA4101	SMK Dato' Haji Mohd Redza	70400	Seremban	2.7334°N 101.9590°E
NEE4098	SMK Dato' Klana Putra	71750	Lenggeng	2.8669°N 101.9394°E
NEE4100	SMK Dato' Mohd Said	71800	Nilai	2.8029°N 101.7970°E
NEE5040	SMK Dato' Mohd Taha	73200	Gemencheh	2.5262°N 102.3990°E
NEA3035	SMK Dato' Sedia Raja	71309	Rembau	2.5961°N 102.0770°E
NEA4098	SMK Dato' Shahardin	71900	Labu	2.7575°N 101.8260°E
NEA4116	SMK Dato' Shamsudin Nain	71200	Rantau	2.5733°N 101.9610°E
NEA3036	SMK Dato' Undang Haji Adnan	71350	Kota	2.5234°N 102.1580°E
NEA0025	SMK Dato' Undang Musa Al-Haj	71600	Jelebu	2.9483°N 102.0850°E
NEA0026	SMK Dato' Undang Syed Ali Al-Jufri Simpang Gelami	71600	Kuala Klawang	2.9647°N 102.1220°E
NEE3037	SMK Datuk Abdullah	71350	Kota	2.5097°N 102.1180°E
NEA2053	SMK Datuk Haji Abdul Samad	71000	Port Dickson	2.5275°N 101.8160°E
NEE6001	SMK Datuk Mansor	72100	Bahau	2.8052°N 102.3763°E
NEE2057	SMK Datuk Muhammad Yusof	71150	Linggi	2.4952°N 102.0034°E
NEE1088	SMK Datuk Undang Abdul Manap	73100	Johol	2.5745°N 102.2561°E
NEA4104	SMK Desa Cempaka	71800	Nilai	2.7979°N 101.7683°E
NEA5055	SMK Gemas	73400	Gemas	2.5789°N 102.5950°E
NEA2057	SMK Intan Perdana	71050	Port Dickson	2.4494°N 101.8743°E
NEA5056	SMK Jelai	73480	Gemas	2.6493°N 102.4840°E
NEA6004	SMK Jelai	73100	Johol	2.7045°N 102.3630°E
NEA1083	SMK Juasseh	72500	Juasseh	2.7853°N 102.3054°E
NEA2056	SMK Kampung Baru Sirusa	71050	Port Dickson	2.5079°N 101.8510°E
NEB4089	SMK King George V	70100	Seremban	2.7187°N 101.9450°E
NEA4103	SMK Kompleks KLIA	71800	Nilai	2.7679°N 101.7605°E
NEA4099	SMK Mambau	70300	Seremban	2.6575°N 101.9100°E
NEE4101	SMK Mantin	71700	Mantin	2.8286°N 101.8960°E
NEB4091	SMK Methodist ACS	70000	Seremban	2.7233°N 101.9360°E
NEA4110	SMK Panchor	70400	Seremban	2.7242°N 102.0133°E
NEA5051	SMK Pasir Besar	73420	Gemas	2.6541°N 102.5410°E
NEE2064	SMK Pasir Panjang	71250	Pasir Panjang	2.4281°N 101.9380°E
NEA3038	SMK Pedas	71400	Pedas	2.5952°N 102.0468°E
NEA4102	SMK Pendeta Za'ba	70400	Seremban	2.7249°N 101.9890°E
NEB0027	SMK Pertang	72300	Simpang Pertang	2.9563°N 102.2158°E
NEB4092	SMK Puteri	70200	Seremban	2.7253°N 101.9220°E
NEA2052	SMK Raja Jumaat	71007	Port Dickson	2.5587°N 101.8100°E
NEE4099	SMK Rantau	71200	Seremban	2.5762°N 101.9610°E
NEA1084	SMK Senaling	72000	Kuala Pilah	2.7056°N 102.2550°E
NEA4100	SMK Senawang	70450	Seremban	2.6989°N 101.9830°E
NEA4109	SMK Seremban 2	70300	Seremban	2.7013°N 101.9046°E
NEA4117	SMK Seremban 3	70300	Seremban	2.6810°N 101.9400°E
NEA4111	SMK Seremban Jaya	70450	Seremban	2.6780°N 101.9690°E
NEA4113	SMK Seremban Jaya 2	70450	Seremban	2.6681°N 101.9732°E
NEB4093	SMK Seri Ampangan	70400	Seremban	2.7258°N 101.9694°E
NEA6011	SMK Seri Jempol	72120	Bandar Seri Jempol	2.9060°N 102.4076°E
NEA4106	SMK Seri Pagi	70450	Seremban	2.7100°N 101.9880°E
NEA6003	SMK Seri Perpatih	73430	Gemas	2.7415°N 102.6470°E
NEA6009	SMK Serting Hilir Kompleks	72120	Bandar Seri Jempol	2.9473°N 102.5010°E
NEB4090	SMK St Paul	70200	Seremban	2.7287°N 101.9330°E
NEA4114	SMK Taman Forest Heights	70450	Seremban	2.7140°N 101.9741°E
NEA5057	SMK Taman Indah	73000	Tampin	2.4801°N 102.2427°E
NEA4105	SMK Taman Semarak	71800	Nilai	2.8214°N 101.8145°E
NEA4107	SMK Taman Tuanku Jaafar	71450	Seremban	2.6624°N 101.9984°E
NEE2065	SMK Tanah Merah	71960	Port Dickson	2.6153°N 101.8010°E
NEE0028	SMK Teriang Hilir	72400	Simpang Durian	3.0997°N 102.2260°E
NEB2054	SMK Tinggi Port Dickson (Port Dickson High School)	71000	Port Dickson	2.5231°N 101.8210°E
NEE5038	SMK Tuanku Abdul Rahman	73400	Gemas	2.5838°N 102.6080°E
NEB1081	SMK Tuanku Muhammad	72000	Kuala Pilah	2.7293°N 102.2495°E
NEA4088	SMK Tunku Ampuan Durah	70400	Seremban	2.7364°N 101.9610°E
NEB4095	SMK Tunku Ampuan Najihah	70200	Seremban	2.7412°N 101.9360°E
NEE5037	SMK Tunku Besar	73000	Tampin	2.4744°N 102.2210°E
NEE1086	SMK Tunku Besar Burhanuddin	71550	Seri Menanti	2.7002°N 102.1610°E
NEB1082	SMK Tunku Kurshiah	72000	Kuala Pilah	2.7297°N 102.2460°E
NEA5052	SMK Tunku Syed Idrus	73000	Tampin	2.4753°N 102.2270°E
NEB0026	SMK Undang Jelebu	71600	Kuala Klawang	2.9535°N 102.0588°E
NEB3036	SMK Undang Rembau	71309	Rembau	2.5870°N 102.0970°E
NEA4115	SMK Warisan Puteri	70400	Seremban	2.7406°N 101.9740°E
NEA2055	SMK Yam Tuan Radin	71010	Lukut	2.5838°N 101.8570°E
NEA1080	SMK Zaba	72000	Kuala Pilah	2.7280°N 102.2485°E

=== Sekolah Menengah Jenis Kebangsaan (SMJK) ===
School code	School name	Name In Chinese	Postcode	Area	Coordinates
NEB4094	SMJK Chan Wa	振华国民型华文中学	70200	Seremban	2.7404°N 101.9400°E
NEA4119	SMJK Chan Wa II	振华二校国民型华文中学	70200	Seremban	2.7381°N 101.9037°E
NEB6001	SMJK Chi Wen	启文国民型华文中学	72100	Bahau	2.8095°N 102.4040°E
NEB1083	SMJK Chung Hua	中华国民型华文中学	72000	Kuala Pilah	2.7330°N 102.2490°E

== National type schools ==
A) Primary Schools a. Tamil Schools: "Sekolah Jenis Kebangsaan Tamil (SJKT)

- Convent, Seremban 2
- Lorong Jawa, 70100 Seremban
- Jalan Lobak, 70200 Seremban.
- Nilai,71800 Nilai
- Ladang Batang Benar,71800 Nilai
- Ladang Kirby, 71900 Labu
- Ladang Kubang, 71800 Nilai
- Jindaram, 71800 Nilai
- Cairo, 71700 Mantin
- Ladang Labu Bhg. 1,71900 Labu
- Ladang Labu Bhg.4, 71900 Labu
- Ladang Senawang.71450 Seremban
- Ladang Seremban, 71450 Seremban
- Perhentian Tinggi,71450 Sg. Gadut
- Ladang Kombok, 71200 Rantau
- Rantau,71200 Rantau
- Ladang Shanghai,70300 Seremban
- Tun Sambanthan, Pajam,71700 Mantin
- Ladang Lenggeng, 71750 Lenggeng
- Port Dickson,71000 Port dickson
- Ladang St. Leonards,71000 P.Dickson
- Ladang Sendayan, 71100 Siliau
- Kem Askar Diraja Melayu, 71050 Si Rusa
- Ladang Sengkang, 71250 Pasir Panjang
- Ladang Sungala, 71050 Si Rusa
- Ldg. Sua Betong,71000 Port Dickson
- Ldg. Tanah Merah,71000 Port Dickson
- Ldg. Atherton,71100 Siliau
- Ladang Bradwal,71100 Siliau
- Ladang Jemima,71100 Siliau
- Ladang Sungai Salak,71100 Siliau
- Ladang Saga,71100 Siliau
- Ladang Siliau,71100 Siliau
- Ladang Lin Sum,71200 Rantau
- Ladang Tampin Linggi, 71100 Siliau
- Mukundan, Bukit Pelandok,71960 Seremban
- Kuala Pilah,72000 Kuala Pilah
- Ladang Juasseh,72000 Kuala Pilah
- Ladang Bahau,72100 Bahau
- Ladang Air Hitam,72100 Bahau
- Ladang Geddes,72100 Bahau
- Ladang Sungai Sebaling,72100 Bahau
- Ladang Kelpin,72100 Bahau
- Ladang Senama,72100 Bahau
- Ladang St. Helier,72100 Bahau
- Ladang Sialang,72100 Bahau
- Ladang Jeram Padang,72100 Bahau
- Ladang Tanah Panjis,73500 Rompin
- Ladang Middleton,73500 Rompin
- Ladang Pertang,72300 Sg. Pertang
- Tampin,73000 Tampin
- Ladang Repah,73000 Tampin
- Ladang Regent,73200 Gemenceh
- Air Kuning Selatan,73200 Gemenceh
- Ladang Bukit Keledek,77100 Jasin
- Gemas,73400 Gemas
- Ladang Sungai Gelama,73400 Gemas
- Ladang Batu Hampar,71300 Rembau
- Ladang Chembong,71300 Rembau
- Ladang Sungai Bharu,71150 Linggi

== Chinese Type Primary School ==
=== Chinese Primary School ===
- SJK (C) AIR KUNING SELATAN
- SJK (C) BAHAU
- SJK (C) CHAN WA
- SJK (C) CHI CHI
- SJK (C) CHI HWA
- SJK (C) CHI SIN
- SJK (C) CHI WEN
- SJK (C) CHUAH
- SJK (C) CHUN YIN
- SJK (C) CHUNG HUA
- SJK (C) CHUNG HUA KUALA PILAH
- SJK (C) CHUNG HUA RANTAU
- SJK (C) CHUNG HUA SENALING
- SJK (C) CHUNG HUA TAMPIN
- SJK (C) CHUNG HUA TG. IPOH
- SJK (C) CHUNG PIN
- SJK (C) CHUNG SAN
- SJK (C) KG. BARU BATU 8
- SJK (C) KG. BARU BK GELUGOR
- SJK (C) KG. BARU BROGA
- SJK (C) KG. BARU DURIAN TIPUS
- SJK (C) KG. BARU GEDOK
- SJK (C) KG. BARU GEMAS
- SJK (C) KG. BARU KEPIS
- SJK (C) KG. BARU MAHSAN
- SJK (C) KG. BARU MAMBAU
- SJK (C) KG. BARU PAJAM
- SJK (C) KG. BARU PANTAI
- SJK (C) KG. BARU PARIT TINGGI
- SJK (C) KG. BARU PAROI
- SJK (C) KG. BARU PERTANG
- SJK (C) KG. BARU PETALING
- SJK (C) KG. BARU RAHANG
- SJK (C) KG. BARU SG. NIPAH
- SJK (C) KG. BARU SIKAMAT
- SJK (C) KG. BARU TAMPIN
- SJK (C) KG. BARU TANAH MERAH (A)
- SJK (C) KG. SG. MUNTOH
- SJK (C) KUO MIN
- SJK (C) KUO MIN
- SJK (C) KUO MIN
- SJK (C) LDG BRADWALL
- SJK (C) LDG GLENDALE
- SJK (C) LDG HILLSIDE
- SJK (C) LDG KELPIN
- SJK (C) LDG MIDDLETON
- SJK (C) LDG REGENT
- SJK (C) LDG SENDAYAN
- SJK (C) LDG SILIAU
- SJK (C) LDG SUA BETONG
- SJK (C) LDG ULU KANCHONG
- SJK (C) MA HWA
- SJK (C) MIN SHING
- SJK (C) PEI CHUN
- SJK (C) PEI HUA
- SJK (C) PEI HWA PEDAS
- SJK (C) PEI TECK KOTA
- SJK (C) SAN MIN
- SJK (C) SG. SALAK
- SJK (C) SIN HUA
- SJK (C) SIN MIN
- SJK (C) SIN MIN
- SJK (C) SINO-ENGLISH
- SJK (C) SPG PERTANG
- SJK (C) ST. LEONARDS
- SJK (C) TANAH MERAH SITE (C)
- SJK (C) TUNG HU
- SJK (C) YIK CHIAO
- SJK (C) YIK HWA
- SJK (C) YOKE HUA AIR MAWANG
- SJK (C) YU CHAI
- SJK (C) YUK CHAI
- SJK (C) YUK HUA
- SJK (C) YUK HUA
- SJK (C) YUK HUA REMBAU

== Technical secondary schools: Sekolah Menengah Teknik (SMT) ==
- SMT Ampangan, Seremban
- SMT Dato' Undang Haji Muhamad Sharip, Rembau
- SMT Dato'Lela Maharaja, Rembau
- SMV Juasseh, Juasseh
- SMT Kuala Klawang, Jelebu
- SMT Port Dickson, Port Dickson
- SMT Tuanku Jaafar, Seremban (STTJ)

== Boarding schools ==
Fully residential schools (SBP)

- Kolej Tunku Kurshiah (TKC)
- Sekolah Datuk Abdul Razak (SDAR)
- Sekolah Menengah Sains Tuanku Munawir (SASER)
- Sekolah Menengah Agama Persekutuan Labu (SMAPL)
- Sekolah Menengah Sains Rembau (SEMESRA)
- Sekolah Menengah Sains Tuanku Jaafar (STJ)
- Sekolah Berasrama Penuh Intergrasi Jempol (SBPIJ)
- Sekolah Menengah Sains Tuanku Aishah Rohani (SGS)

== International schools ==
- Epsom College in Malaysia
- Nilai International School
- Kolej Tuanku Ja'afar
- Zenith International School
- Matrix Global School
- UCSI International School Bandar Springhill

== Others ==
- Kolej Mara Seremban
- Maktab Rendah Sains MARA Kuala Klawang
- Maktab Rendah Sains MARA Serting
- Maktab Rendah Sains MARA Gemencheh
- Sekolah Agama Ar-Raudhah

== See also ==
- Education in Malaysia
