= Malaysia Federal Route 3265 =

Road in Malaysia

Federal Route 3265
- Jalan Nilai–Pajam

Route information
- Maintained by Malaysian Public Works Department
- Length: 11.6 km (7.2 mi)

Major junctions
- West end: Salak, Selangor
- B48 State Route B48; FT 362 Federal Route 362; North–South Expressway Southern Route / AH2; FT 32 Federal Route 32; Kajang–Seremban Highway; FT 1 Federal Route 1
- East end: Mantin, Negeri Sembilan

Location
- Country: Malaysia
- Primary destinations: Nilai, Bandar Baru Nilai, Batang Benar, Pajam, Mantin

Highway system
- Highways in Malaysia; Expressways; Federal; State

Federal Route 3265, or Jalan Nilai–Pajam (formerly Negeri Sembilan State Route N36), is an industrial federal road in Negeri Sembilan, Malaysia.

== Route background ==
The Kilometre Zero is located at Salak, Selangor.

== Features ==
At most sections, the Federal Route 3265 was built under the JKR R5 road standard, allowing maximum speed limit of up to 90 km/h.

== Junctions lists ==
Legend:

- I/C - Interchange, I/S - Intersection, RSA - Rest and service area, OBR - Overhead bridge restaurant, R/R - Restaurant and rest plaza, L/B - Layby, V/P - Vista point, TN - tunnel, T/P - Toll plaza, BR - Bridge
- C - Cloverleaf, S - Stack, T-A - Trumpet-A, T-B - Trumpet-B, DT - Directional-T/Y, SDT - Semi-Directional-T/Y, P-Y - Partial-Y, D - Diamond, P-C - Partial cloverleaf, D-D - Diverging diamond, D-R - Direct ramp

State	District	Location	km	mi	Name	Destinations	Notes
Selangor	Sepang	Salak	0.0	0.0	Salak	B48 Selangor State Route B48 – Dengkil, Putrajaya, Cyberjaya, Salak Tinggi, Sepang, Kuala Lumpur International Airport (KLIA)	T-junctions
Negeri Sembilan	Seremban	Batang Labu			Jalan Batang Labu	N163 Jalan Batang Labu – FELDA LB Johnson	T-junctions
Negeri Sembilan	Seremban	Batang Labu			Kampung Kubang		
Negeri Sembilan	Seremban	Batang Labu			Sungai Batang Labu bridge		
Negeri Sembilan	Seremban	Nilai			Nilai; Jalan Labu	FT 362 Malaysia Federal Route 362 – Sepang Road, Labu, Port Dickson, SMA Persekutuan Labu	T-junctions
Negeri Sembilan	Seremban	Nilai			Nilai	Nilai Old Mosque	
Negeri Sembilan	Seremban	Nilai			Nilai; Nilai Komuter station	P&R Nilai Komuter station – KTM Komuter Batu Caves–Pulau Sebang Line	
Negeri Sembilan	Seremban	Nilai			Nilai; Bandar Baru Nilai	Jalan BBN 4/1 – Bandar Baru Nilai, Salak Tinggi, Kuala Lumpur International Airport (KLIA); North–South Expressway Southern Route / AH2 – Kuala Lumpur, Malacca, Johor Bahru	T-junctions
Negeri Sembilan	Seremban	Nilai			Old Nilai-NSE	North–South Expressway Southern Route	Interchange closed in 2002, replaced with new interchange
Negeri Sembilan	Seremban	Nilai			Nilai Square; Taman Semarak		
Negeri Sembilan	Seremban	Nilai			Nilai Industrial Area	FT 32 Malaysia Federal Route 32 – Nilai Industrial Area, Nilai 3, Salak Tinggi, Kuala Lumpur International Airport (KLIA), Banting; North–South Expressway Southern Route / AH2 – Kuala Lumpur, Malacca, Johor Bahru	T-junctions with ramp to route FT32
Negeri Sembilan	Seremban	Nilai			Railway crossing bridge		
Negeri Sembilan	Seremban	Batang Benar			Quarry factory		
Negeri Sembilan	Seremban	Batang Benar			Batang Benar Komuter station	P&R Batang Benar Komuter station – KTM Komuter Batu Caves–Pulau Sebang Line	
Negeri Sembilan	Seremban	Batang Benar			Batang Benar	Jalan Batang Benar – Kampung Batang Benar, Bandar Putra Mahkota, Bangi	T-junctions
Negeri Sembilan	Seremban	Pajam			Pajam-LEKAS	Kajang–Seremban Highway – Kuala Lumpur, Kajang, Semenyih, Mantin, Seremban	T-junctions
Negeri Sembilan	Seremban	Pajam			Taman Melor		
Negeri Sembilan	Seremban	Pajam			Sungai Pajam bridge		
Negeri Sembilan	Seremban	Pajam			Pajam		
Negeri Sembilan	Seremban	Pajam			Kampung Baharu Pajam		
Negeri Sembilan	Seremban	Pajam			Bandar Akademia		
Negeri Sembilan	Seremban	Pajam			Tuanku Jaafar College		
Negeri Sembilan	Seremban	Pajam			Taman Anggerik Pajam		
Negeri Sembilan	Seremban	Mantin			Kampung Gebok		
Negeri Sembilan	Seremban	Mantin	11.6	7.2	Mantin; Jalan Mantin	FT 1 Malaysia Federal Route 1 – Kuala Lumpur, Kajang, Beranang, Mantin, Seremban	T-junctions
1.000 mi = 1.609 km; 1.000 km = 0.621 mi: Closed/former
