= Seremban Inner Ring Road =

Road in Malaysia

Major junctions
- From: Jalan Mantin Interchange
- FT 1 Federal Route 1 FT 51 Federal Route 51; FT 53 Federal Route 53; FT 362 Federal Route 362; FT 241 Jalan Sungai Ujong
- To: Jalan Sungai Ujong Interchange

Location
- Country: Malaysia

Highway system
- Highways in Malaysia; Expressways; Federal; State

Seremban Inner Ring Road (SIRR) or Jalan Lingkaran Dalam Seremban is a multi-lane ring road highway in Seremban, Negeri Sembilan, Malaysia.

The Kilometre Zero of the SIRR is located at Jalan Mantin interchange. It connects to the Kajang–Seremban Highway.

At most sections, the SIRR was built under the JKR R5 road standard, allowing maximum speed limit of up to 90 km/h.

== Junction lists ==
The entire route is located in Seremban District, Negeri Sembilan.

Legend:

- I/C - Interchange, I/S - Intersection, RSA - Rest and service area, OBR - Overhead bridge restaurant, R/R - Restaurant and rest plaza, L/B - Layby, V/P - Vista point, TN - tunnel, T/P - Toll plaza, BR - Bridge
- C - Cloverleaf, S - Stack, T-A - Trumpet-A, T-B - Trumpet-B, DT - Directional-T/Y, SDT - Semi-Directional-T/Y, P-Y - Partial-Y, D - Diamond, P-C - Partial cloverleaf, D-D - Diverging diamond, D-R - Direct ramp

Location	km	mi	Name	Destinations	Notes
Seremban	0.0	0.0	Jalan Mantin I/C	FT 1 Jalan Mantin – Kuala Lumpur, Kajang, Mantin, City Centre	Interchange
Seremban			Jalan Lam Teck Choon I/S	Jalan Lam Teck Choon – Taman Jaya Emas	Junctions
Seremban			Jalan Temiang I/C	Jalan Temiang	Interchange
Seremban			Jalan Kilat I/S	Jalan Leftenan Adnan – Kampung Merbah	Roundabout
Seremban			Taman Sikamat Baru I/S	Jalan Tungku Kurshiah – Taman Sikamat Baru	Junctions
Seremban			Jalan Sikamat I/C	N38 Jalan Sikamat – Sikamat, Kuala Klawang	Interchange
Seremban			Ampangan I/C	FT 51 Jalan Ampangan – City Centre, Sikamat, Kuala Klawang, Paroi, Kuala Pilah, Seri Menanti	Diamond interchange
Seremban			Taman Dusun Niyor I/C	Jalan Nyior Gading 1 – Taman Dusun Niyor; Jalan Nyior Gading 1 – Taman Bidara	Both bounds LILO
Seremban			Rahang flyover Rahang I/C; Sungai Linggi bridge Railway crossing bridge	FT 1 Jalan Senawang – City Centre, Senawang, Rembau; North–South Expressway Southern Route / AH2 – Kuala Lumpur, Johor Bahru	Diamond interchange
Seremban			Rasah flyover Jalan Rasah I/C; Railway crossing bridge	FT 53 Jalan Rasah – City Centre, Tuanku Jaafar Hospital, Mambau, Port Dickson; North–South Expressway Southern Route / AH2 – Kuala Lumpur, Johor Bahru	Stacked elevated cloverleaf interchange
Seremban			Jalan Labu	FT 362 Malaysia Federal Route 362 – Mantin, Labu	Straight through
Seremban			Taman Permai I/C	Jalan Kerapu – Taman Permai, Kampung Baru Rasah	Interchange
Seremban			Jalan Sungai Ujong I/C	FT 241 Jalan Sungai Ujong – Seremban 2, Bandar Sri Sendayan, Labu, Nilai, Kuala Lumpur International Airport (KLIA), City Centre, Mantin, Kajang; North–South Expressway Southern Route / AH2 – Kuala Lumpur, Johor Bahru	Interchange
1.000 mi = 1.609 km; 1.000 km = 0.621 mi
