= Malaysia Federal Route 1266 =

Road in Malaysia

Federal Route 1266
- Jalan FELDA LB Johnson

Route information
- Maintained by Malaysian Public Works Department
- Length: 16.750 km (10.408 mi): Entrance: 11.500 km (7.146 mi); Village: 5.250 km (3.262 mi)

Major junctions
- West end: B48 Jalan Dengkil–Sepang
- B48 State Route B48; FT 195 Federal Route 195; FT 1265 Federal Route 1265
- East end: FT 1265 Jalan Nilai–Port Dickson

Location
- Country: Malaysia
- Primary destinations: Salak Tinggi, Dengkil, Sepang, Kuala Lumpur International Airport (KLIA), FELDA LB Johnson, Nilai, Seremban

Highway system
- Highways in Malaysia; Expressways; Federal; State

Federal Route 1266, or Jalan FELDA LB Johnson (formerly Negeri Sembilan State Route N68), is a major federal road in Negeri Sembilan, Malaysia.

== History ==
The Public Works Department has upgraded Federal Route 1266 and construction of a new road from Enstek junction to Federal Route 195 in Kualiti Alam along 12.676 km (7.877 mi) according to R5 standards (4 lanes, 2-way), which covers the following scope:

- Upgrading FT1266 road (existing 2 lanes, 2-way) along 6.5 km (4.0 mi)
- Upgrading Taman Eka Matahari road along 2.5 km (1.6 mi)
- Construction of a new road from Taman Eka Matahari to Kualiti Alam along 3.676 km (2.284 mi) through a rocky hilly area (Bukit Nenas)
- 7 intersections, with 5 intersections with traffic lights; 1 intersection without traffic lights and 1 U-turn:
1. Kampung Jijan Intersection
2. KPM Intersection (Gate 2)
3. KPM Intersection (Gate 1)
4. Kampung Gadong
5. Taman Eka Matahari Intersection
6. 1 no-signal intersection (left in/left out) at АКЕРТ
7. 1 'U' turn at Kualiti Alam Intersection
- Construction of retaining wall and bridge structures
- Installation of street lights and traffic lights
- Upgrading of drainage and sewerage systems
- Land acquisition
- Relocation of Utilities

== Features ==
For most sections, Federal Route 1266 was built under the JKR R5 road standard, allowing a maximum speed limit of up to 90 km/h (56 mph).

== Junction lists ==
Legend:

- I/C - Interchange, I/S - Intersection, RSA - Rest and service area, OBR - Overhead bridge restaurant, R/R - Restaurant and rest plaza, L/B - Layby, V/P - Vista point, TN - tunnel, T/P - Toll plaza, BR - Bridge
- C - Cloverleaf, S - Stack, T-A - Trumpet-A, T-B - Trumpet-B, DT - Directional-T/Y, SDT - Semi-Directional-T/Y, P-Y - Partial-Y, D - Diamond, P-C - Partial cloverleaf, D-D - Diverging diamond, D-R - Direct ramp

State	District	Location	km	mi	Name	Destinations	Notes
Selangor	Sepang	Salak			Jalan Dengkil–Sepang	B48 Selangor State Route B48 – Salak Tinggi, Dengkil, Kuala Lumpur, Kuala Lumpur International Airport (KLIA), Sepang, Port Dickson	T-junctions
Negeri Sembilan	Seremban	Bandar Enstek			Bandar Baru Enstek	Persiaran Miilenia 2 Persiaran Teknologi 1	Junctions
Negeri Sembilan	Seremban	Bandar Enstek			Jalan Batang Labu	N183 Negeri Sembilan State Route N183 – Nilai	T-junctions
Negeri Sembilan	Seremban	Bandar Enstek			Kampung LBJ	FT 195 Malaysia Federal Route 195 – Kampung Sendayan, Seremban; North–South Expressway Southern Route / AH2 – Kuala Lumpur, Johor Bahru	T-junctions
Negeri Sembilan	Seremban	Bandar Enstek			Jalan Nilai–Port Dickson	FT 1265 Malaysia Federal Route 1265 – Nilai, Labu, Port Dickson, Mambau, Seremban; North–South Expressway Southern Route / AH2 – Kuala Lumpur, Johor Bahru	T-junctions
1.000 mi = 1.609 km; 1.000 km = 0.621 mi
