= Malaysia Federal Route 1265 =

Road in Malaysia

Federal Route 1265
- Jalan Labu–Sendayan

Route information
- Maintained by Malaysian Public Works Department

Major junctions
- North end: Labu
- FT 362 Federal Route 362; FT 1266 Federal Route 1266; FT 195 Federal Route 195; N68 Jalan Kampung Gadong; FT 53 Federal Route 53
- South end: Sendayan

Location
- Country: Malaysia
- Primary destinations: Nilai, Sepang, Mambau

Highway system
- Highways in Malaysia; Expressways; Federal; State

Federal Route 1265, Jalan Labu–Sendayan (formerly Negeri Sembilan State Route N1) is a federal road in Negeri Sembilan, Malaysia.

At most sections, the Federal Route 1265 was built under the JKR R5 road standard, allowing maximum speed limit of up to 90 km/h (56 mph).

== Junction lists ==
The entire route is located in Seremban District, Negeri Sembilan.

Location	km	mi	Name	Destinations	Notes
Labu			Jalan Labu	FT 362 Malaysia Federal Route 362 – Nilai, Sepang Road, Salak Tinggi, Kuala Lumpur International Airport, Seremban; North–South Expressway Southern Route / AH2 – Kuala Lumpur, Johor Bahru	T-junctions
Gadong			Kampung Gadong		
Gadong			Kampong Gadong Jaya	FT 1266 Malaysia Federal Route 1266 – FELDA LB Johnson, Sepang, Dengkil, Kuala Lumpur International Airport (KLIA), Sepang	T-junctions
Sendayan			Sendayan	FT 195 Malaysia Federal Route 195 – Sendayan Techvalley, Eka Heights, Sendayan Metropark, Ara Sendayan, Bukit Nenas, Bukit Nenas Toxic Waste Disposal Facilities, Seremban; North–South Expressway Southern Route / AH2 – Kuala Lumpur, Johor Bahru	Junctions
Sendayan			Kampung FELDA Sendayan		
Sendayan			Kampung Jimah Baru		
Sendayan			Jalan Port Dickson	FT 53 Malaysia Federal Route 53 – Seremban, Mambau, Port Dickson, Lukut	T-junctions
1.000 mi = 1.609 km; 1.000 km = 0.621 mi
