= Johor State Route J107 =

Road in Malaysia

Johor Route 107
- Jalan Parit Panjang

Major junctions
- Northeast end: Sedenak
- FT 1 Federal Route 1 North–South Expressway Southern Route / AH2; FT 5 Federal Route 5
- Southwest end: Ayer Baloi

Location
- Country: Malaysia
- Primary destinations: FELDA Bukit Batu

Highway system
- Highways in Malaysia; Expressways; Federal; State

Jalan Parit Panjang, Johor State Route J107 is a major road in Johor, Malaysia. It is also a main route to North–South Expressway Southern Route via Sedenak Interchange.

== History ==
In conjunction of construction of additional lanes on North–South Expressway Southern Route from Yong Peng North Interchange to Senai North Interchange, the government approved the several new projects Rolling Plan 1 of the Thirteenth Malaysia Plan to support the development of the Johor-Singapore Special Economic Zone (JS-SEZ), include upgrading Jalan Parit Panjang from Pekan Air Baloi, Pontian, to the Sedenak Toll Interchange and upgrading of the Senai–Desaru Expressway from the Sungai Johor Bridge to Desaru.

Jalan Parit Panjang becomes one of the E32 West Coast Expressway southern extensions proposed interchanges in Johor alignment.

== Junction lists ==
The entire route is located in Johor.

Legend:

- I/C - Interchange, I/S - Intersection, RSA - Rest and service area, OBR - Overhead bridge restaurant, R/R - Restaurant and rest plaza, L/B - Layby, V/P - Vista point, TN - tunnel, T/P - Toll plaza, BR - Bridge
- C - Cloverleaf, S - Stack, T-A - Trumpet-A, T-B - Trumpet-B, DT - Directional-T/Y, SDT - Semi-Directional-T/Y, P-Y - Partial-Y, D - Diamond, P-C - Partial cloverleaf, D-D - Diverging diamond, D-R - Direct ramp

District	Location	km	mi	Name	Destinations	Notes
Kulai	Sedenak			Sedenak	FT 1 Malaysia Federal Route 1 – Yong Peng, Ayer Hitam, Batu Pahat, Kluang, Simpang Renggam, Layang-Layang, Kelapa Sawit, Kulai, Kota Tinggi, Senai, Skudai, Johor Bahru	T-junctions
Kulai	Sedenak			Sungai Ulu Pontian Besar bridge		
Kulai	Sedenak			Sedenak-NSE	North–South Expressway Southern Route / AH2 – Kuala Lumpur, Malacca, Simpang Renggam, Kulai, Senai International Airport, Johor Bahru, Singapore	T-junctions
Kulai	FELDA Bukit Batu			FELDA Bukit Batu		
Pontian	Parit Panjang			Jalan Parit Sikom	J118 Jalan Parit Sikom–Parit Panjang – Parit Sikom; J115 Jalan Parit Sikom – Kayu Ara Pasong	T-junctions
Pontian	Parit Panjang			Parit Panjang	J208 Jalan Rejo Sari – Parit Wagiman	T-junctions
Pontian	Ayer Baloi			Ayer Baloi-WCE I/C	West Coast Expressway	Under planning
Pontian	Ayer Baloi			Ayer Baloi	FT 5 Malaysia Federal Route 5 – Malacca, Muar, Batu Pahat, Benut, Pontian, Kukup, Johor Bahru	T-junctions
1.000 mi = 1.609 km; 1.000 km = 0.621 mi: Proposed
