= Epsom College in Malaysia =

British school in Malaysia

Location
- Persiaran Kolej, 71760; Bandar Enstek, Negeri Sembilan; Malaysia
- Coordinates: 02°44′42″N 101°46′06″E

Information
- Type: Private day and boarding school
- Motto: "Deo Non Fortuna" (Latin for "By God, not by luck")
- Established: 2014; 12 years ago
- Founder: Epsom College, United Kingdom
- Headmaster: Matthew Brown
- Gender: Coeducational
- Age: 3 to 18
- Website: www.epsomcollege.edu.my

Epsom College Malaysia is a British-inspired co-educational independent school at Bandar Enstek, Labu, Seremban District, Negeri Sembilan, Malaysia, teaching children between the ages of eleven and eighteen in English.

The school also offers a prep school, or junior school, for children aged three to eleven.

== History ==
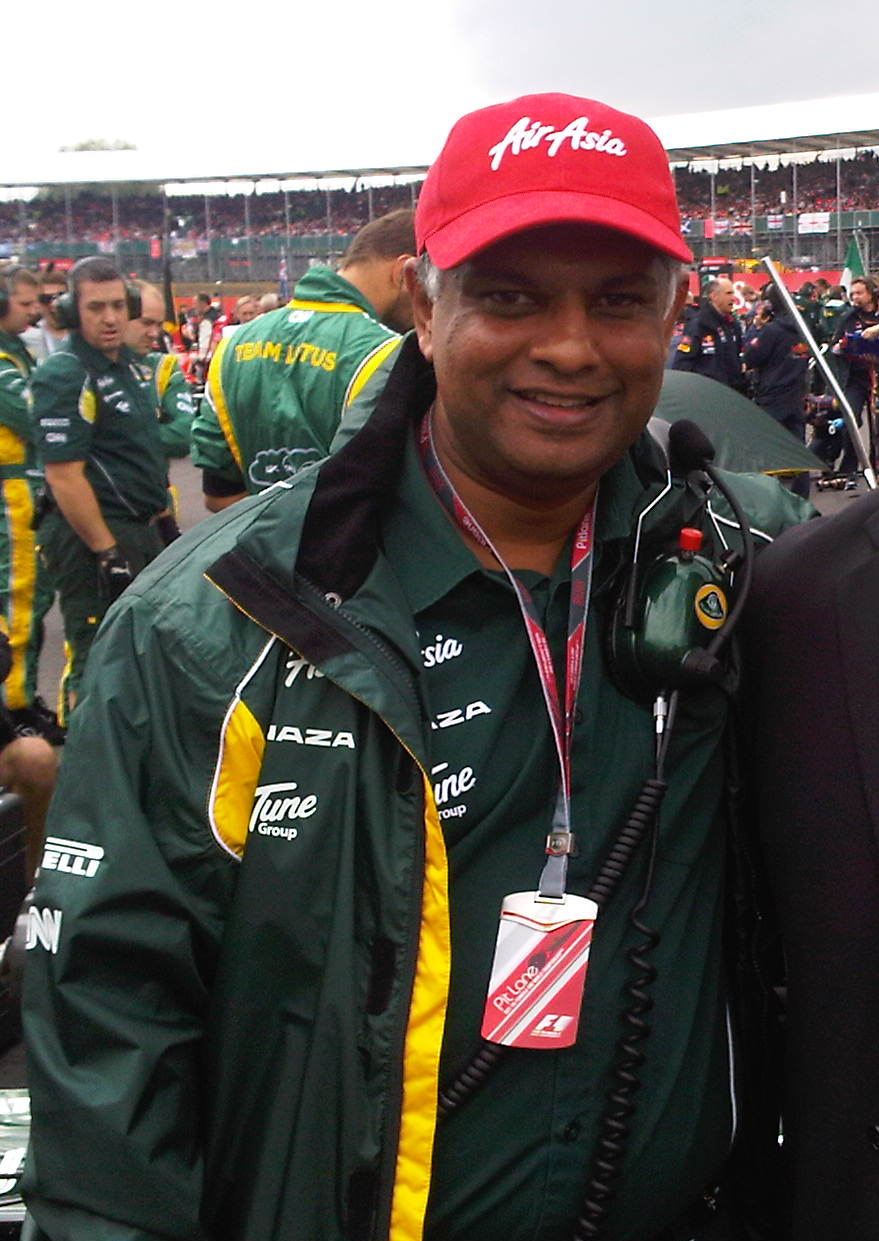
Tony Fernandes in 2011

The school has been called "the brainchild of Tony Fernandes", a Malaysian business magnate who had been educated at the original Epsom College in England.

Tony Fernandes gained the support of the head of the English Epsom College, Stephen Borthwick, who also played a leading role in the creation of the school. Borthwick announced the project in December 2009, stating that the new school would follow a British curriculum and teach about 900 children between the ages of eleven and eighteen, mostly boarders. He said a high calibre project team had been put in place. In 2010, Borthwick added that it was planned to employ teaching staff mostly from the United Kingdom. The Malaysian government gave the project its support, and the new buildings and campus were built according to designs by a British firm, NVB Architects. In June 2012, the new Epsom College was nearing completion on a 50 acres (20 ha) campus at Bandar Enstek. Borthwick said there would be "real pollination between the two schools through pupil and staff exchanges".

CNN noted in September 2012 that the planned new Epsom College was part of a trend for leading British schools to open counterparts in Asia, such as Dulwich College and Wellington College in China and Haileybury in Kazakhstan.

The school finally opened in September 2014. In December 2014, Boris Johnson visited the school for its opening ceremony, joining Tunku Ali Redhauddin, eldest son of the Yamtuan Besar of Negeri Sembilan, the British High Commissioner to Malaysia, Victoria Treadell, and Tony Fernandes, who was the first Chairman of the Governing Body. By 2018, Fernandes and his partners had invested RM150 million in the school.

== Campus ==
The school has a campus of 50 acres (20 ha). The main building contains some eighty classrooms, and there is a separate music school, with a concert hall and its own classrooms, a recording studio, an art building, and a medical centre.

As well as playing fields for rugby, cricket, and netball, there are tennis court, a swimming pool, an athletics hall, and a squash court, on campus.

Most boarders at the school sleep in rooms with between two and four beds, while older students have the option of single rooms.

== Curriculum ==
The school teaches the National Curriculum for England in the English language, aiming to prepare children for English-speaking universities. There are many extracurricular options, such as drama, art, design technology, music, and dance.

In 2017, the school announced that it would launch a Mandarin Chinese programme, with Hanyu Shuiping Kaoshi certification, later that year.

In the prep school (for children aged three to eleven) there is a broad range of subjects, which include English, Mandarin, mathematics, computing, science and technology, art and design, music, and physical education.

== Assessment ==
The Good Schools Guide said in 2020 that it was impressed by the school's A-Level results, "with nearly 40 per cent being awarded an A*". Britannia Study reported that in the 2020 examinations, 70 per cent of the school's entrants got an A or A* grade at A Level, while 66 per cent were awarded an A or A* grade in the International General Certificate of Secondary Education. In Mandarin as a second language, theatre studies, drama, and Further Maths, 100 per cent of grades were A or A*.

== Admissions and scholarships ==
For children aged three to six, there are no entry requirements. For older children, there is both an entrance examination and an admission interview. For sixth form entry at 16 plus, the minimum academic results required are seven A grades at IGCSE or Sijil Pelajaran Malaysia. Entry can be at any age, but it is discouraged into Years 11 and 13.

In 2021, annual school fees ranged between RM 51,905 and RM 94,035.

In July 2020, the charitable ECiM Libra Foundation announced that it would be awarding twenty full and thirty partial scholarships to Malaysian students to pursue either an A-Level or an International General Certificate of Secondary Education programme at the school, and in December said that the year's application process was about to close.

== See also ==
- List of schools in Negeri Sembilan
- List of schools in Selangor
- List of schools in Kuala Lumpur
