= Malaysia Federal Route 241 =

Road in Malaysia

Federal Route 241
- Jalan Sungai Ujong

Route information
- Maintained by Malaysian Public Works Department
- Length: 3.50 km (2.17 mi)

Major junctions
- South end: Seremban 2
- FT 195 Seremban–Bukit Nenas Highway; North–South Expressway Southern Route / AH2; FT 362 Jalan Labu; Seremban Inner Ring Road; FT 1 Federal Route 1
- North end: Seremban

Location
- Country: Malaysia
- Primary destinations: Labu, Seremban 2, Nilai

Highway system
- Highways in Malaysia; Expressways; Federal; State

Jalan Sungai Ujong, Federal Route 241, is a major highway in Negeri Sembilan, Malaysia which connecting Seremban to Seremban 2. The stretch between Seremban and Jalan Labu junction used to be known as Negeri Sembilan State Route N38. It is a main route to the North–South Expressway Southern Route via Seremban Interchange. The kilometre zero of the Federal Route 241 is at Seremban.

At most sections, the Federal Route 241 was built under the JKR R5 road standard, allowing maximum speed limit of up to 90 km/h.

== Junction lists ==
The entire route is located in Seremban District, Negeri Sembilan.

Legend:

- I/C - Interchange, I/S - Intersection, RSA - Rest and service area, OBR - Overhead bridge restaurant, R/R - Restaurant and rest plaza, L/B - Layby, V/P - Vista point, TN - tunnel, T/P - Toll plaza, BR - Bridge
- C - Cloverleaf, S - Stack, T-A - Trumpet-A, T-B - Trumpet-B, DT - Directional-T/Y, SDT - Semi-Directional-T/Y, P-Y - Partial-Y, D - Diamond, P-C - Partial cloverleaf, D-D - Diverging diamond, D-R - Direct ramp

Location	km	mi	Exit	Name	Destinations	Notes
Seremban	0.0	0.0		Seremban	FT 1 Jalan Dato' Bandar Tunggal – Mantin, Kajang, Kuala Lumpur	T-junctions
Seremban				Jalan Tuanku Antah	Jalan Tuanku Antah	T-junctions
Seremban				Terminal 1 Shopping Centre		
Seremban			24101	Jalan Lobak-SIRR I/C	Jalan Lobak – Mantin; Seremban Inner Ring Road – Port Dickson, Senawang, Kuala Pilah, Kuala Klawang (Jelebu)	Interchange
Seremban				Taman Bukit Labu	Pesiaran Kemayan Square – Taman Bukit Labu, Kemayan Square, KPJ Seremban Specialist Hospital	Junctions
Seremban				Negeri Sembilan Museum and Cultural Centre	Negeri Sembilan Museum and Cultural Centre	T-junctions
Seremban			Seremban Welcome Arch			
Seremban			24102	Jalan Labu I/C	FT 362 Jalan Labu – Labu, Nilai, Bandar Ainsdale	Diamond interchange
Seremban			24103A	Seremban-NSE (East) I/C	North–South Expressway Southern Route / AH2 – Port Dickson, Malacca, Johor Bahru	Half-diamond interchange
Seremban			24103B	Seremban-NSE (West) I/C	North–South Expressway Southern Route / AH2 – Kuala Lumpur, Kuala Lumpur International Airport (KLIA), Nilai	Cloverleaf interchange Direct exit ramp from Seremban 2
Seremban			24104	Oakland Industrial Area I/C	Jalan Taman Bukit Kepayang Besar 1 – Taman Bukit Kepayang; Jalan Haruan 2 – Oakland Industrial Area, Tesco Extra hypermarket, Pasar Borong Seremban	Diamond interchange
Seremban	3.50	2.17	24105	Seremban 2 I/C	FT 195 Seremban–Bukit Nenas Highway – Bukit Nanas, Bandar Sri Sendayan, Nilai, Sepang, Kuala Lumpur International Airport (KLIA); Persiaran Seremban 2 – Seremban 2	Interchange
1.000 mi = 1.609 km; 1.000 km = 0.621 mi
