= Bandar Enstek =

- Suburb of Seremban
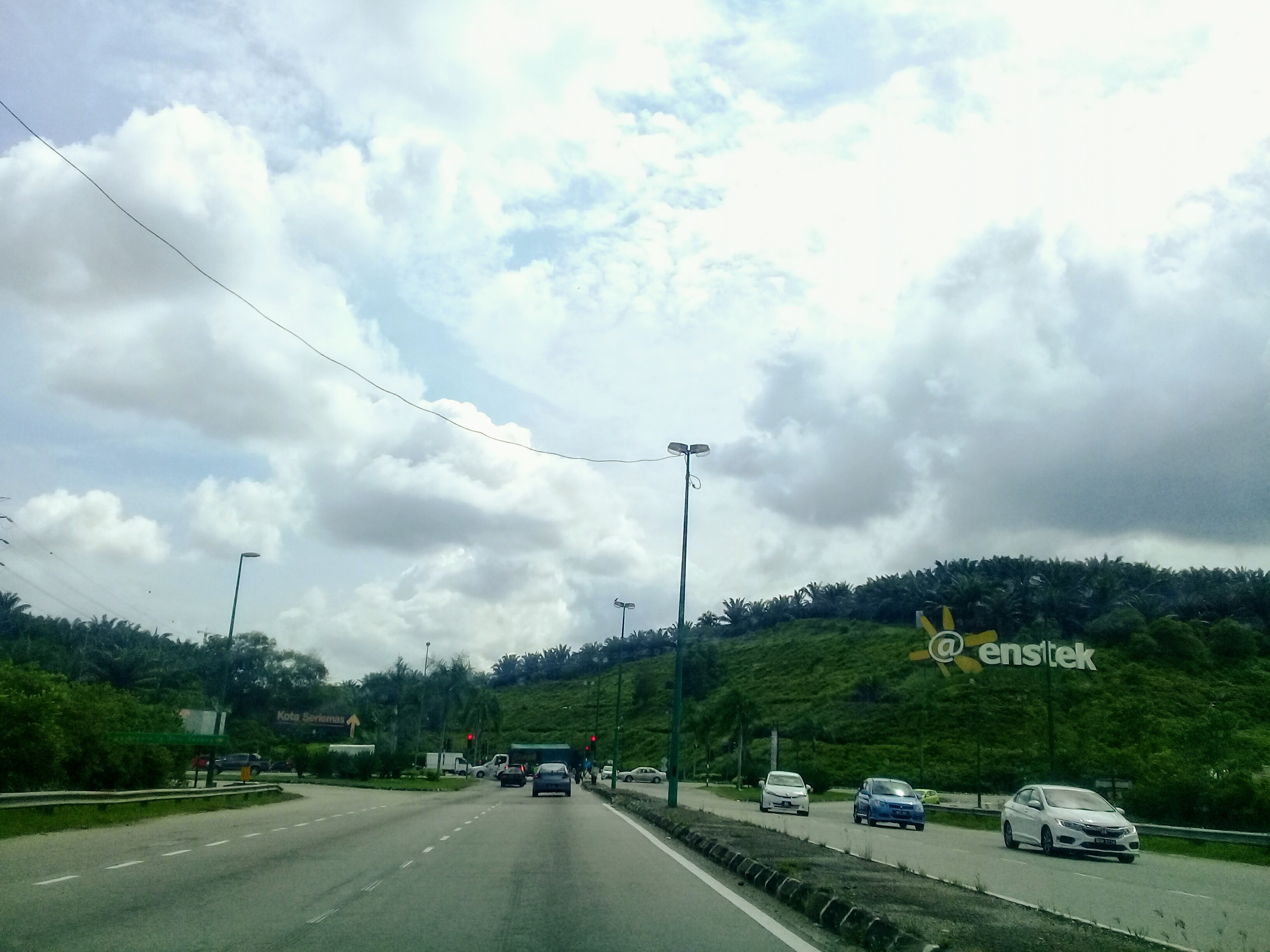
- Bandar Enstek northern entrance, view from Jalan Kuarters KLIA in Selangor.
- Interactive map of Bandar Enstek
- Coordinates: 2°45′28″N 101°45′57″E
- Country: Malaysia
- State: Negeri Sembilan
- District: Seremban
- Luak: Sungai Ujong
- Established: 1999

Government
  - Body: Seremban City Council
  - Mayor: Masri Baharuddin
  - MP: Cha Kee Chin (PH–DAP)
  - MLA: Siti Nur Umaira Hasim (BN–UMNO)
- Elevation: 31 m (102 ft)
- Time zone: UTC+8 (MST)
  - Summer (DST): Not applicable
- Postcode: 71760
- Website: https://enstek.com/

Bandar Enstek in Seremban District

Bandar Enstek is a township in Labu, Seremban District, Negeri Sembilan, Malaysia, situated next to the state border with Selangor. Developed by TH Properties of Tabung Haji, the township was established in 1999, spanning 5,119 acres (2,072 ha). It is within the Malaysia Vision Valley corridor.

== Development ==
The development of Bandar Enstek is divided into four components: housing areas, educational institutions, commercial areas and industrial areas. The township is home to Nilai Polytechnic, the main campus of Aminuddin Baki Institute, the Tunku Kurshiah College, the National Audit Academy, Felda Biotechnology Centre and a Coca-Cola factory.

== Transportation ==
Bandar Enstek is located close to the Kuala Lumpur International Airport (via Federal Route FT 344), as well as Kampung LBJ and Bandar Sri Sendayan (via Federal Routes FT 195 and FT 1266).

Alternatively, the closest commuter station is KTM Komuter Nilai.

== See also ==
- Epsom College in Malaysia
