= SMKA Sheikh Hj Mohd Said =

SMKA Sheikh Haji Mohd Said
- معهد الشيح الحاج محمد سعيد الإسلامي

Location
- Jalan Tunku Kurshiah; 70400 Seremban, Negeri Sembilan; Malaysia

Information
- Type: Islamic Religious School
- Motto: "Dunia dan Akhirat Tuntutan Hidup"
- Established: 1959
- Principal: Ahmad Sharir Bin Abd Ghani
- Grades: Form 1 - Form 6
- Classrooms: Irsyad, Islah, Ikram, Ikhlas, Ihsan
- Yearbook: Hidayah
- Affiliations: SMK Agama, Ministry of Education (Malaysia)
- Website: SMKA SHAMS's Website

Sekolah Menengah Kebangsaan Agama Sheikh Haji Mohd Said (Sheikh Haji Mohd Said Religious Institution) or better known as SHAMS is a federal religious school. It was established in 1959 or to be exactly on 1 June 1959. It is located at Jalan Tunku Kursiah, Seremban, Negeri Sembilan. In 2008, SHAMS had been awarded "Sekolah Kluster Kecemerlangan (SKK)". As one of the cluster school in Malaysia which is recognized internationally, SHAMS has signed an MoU with Madrasah Aliah Negeri, Bukit Tinggi, Indonesia. It was signed to reduce the educational gap between Malaysia and the Republic of Indonesia.

== Historical Developments ==
The school began in 1959 at the old Seri Menanti's Castle Kuala Pilah with the enrollment of 40 male students. It was under the patronage of the local government of Negeri Sembilan and formally known as Sekolah Menengah Ugama Tinggi (SUMT) Negeri Sembilan with reference to as the first religious school in Negeri Sembilan.

In 1963, starting with the intake of 20 females, it reached 135 students. The school got its own site of 11 acres (45,000 m^{2}) at Jalan Tunku Kurshiah, Sikamat, Seremban which is adjacent to Tunku Kurshiah College(TKC), Seremban, a leading residential school. In 1977, the school management was given back to the Ministry of Education Malaysia and the school name was subsequently altered to Sekolah Menengah Kebangsaan Ugama (SMKU) Seremban.

In 1984, in reference to its celebration of Silver Jubilee, the school's name was changed to the current name which was the name of a distinguished ulema, Sheikh Haji Mohd Said. In 2009, the school will celebrate 50 years of establishing .

== Emblem ==
In conjunction with the Silver Jubilee celebration in 1984, a new emblem was designed by a team led by a biology teacher, Cikgu Abdul Aziz, or fondly known as "Cikgu Babuk". The logo is still used until today.

== See also ==
- SMKA Simpang Lima
