= Batang Benar Komuter station =

Railway station in Seremban, Negeri Sembilan, Malaysia

Batang Benar

General information
- Other names: Malay: باتڠ بنر (Jawi); Chinese: 巴当本那; Tamil: பத்தாங் பெனார்
- Location: Batang Benar, Seremban District, Negeri Sembilan, Malaysia.
- Coordinates: 2°49′48″N 101°49′36″E
- System: KB09 | Commuter rail station
- Owner: Railway Assets Corporation
- Operator: Keretapi Tanah Melayu
- Line: West Coast Line
- Platforms: 2 side platforms
- Tracks: 4

Construction
- Structure type: At-grade
- Parking: Available
- Accessible: No

Other information
- Station code: KB09

History
- Opened: 1 February 1903; 123 years ago
- Rebuilt: 1995
- Electrified: 1995

Services
Preceding station	Keretapi Tanah Melayu (Komuter)	Following station
Bangi towards Batu Caves	Batu Caves–Pulau Sebang Line	Nilai towards Pulau Sebang/Tampin
Location

Batang Benar Komuter station is a KTM Komuter train station located near and named after the small town of Batang Benar, Seremban District, Negeri Sembilan, Malaysia. The station is situated off the 4th kilometre of Jalan Pajam, 4 kilometres from the old town of Nilai and the Nilai Komuter station. The station is served by the KTM Komuter's Seremban Line.

The station is situated along a four-lane railway network (consisting of two acceptance routes at both sides and two basic routes in the middle), in charge of managing railway switches and supports a small railway staff. The station has only two platforms for northbound or southbound passengers.

The station is located close to a hillside rock quarry visible from the railroad and station. As such, the station's line is also used to hold hopper cars that receive pebbles from the mine via lorries.

== See also ==
- Rail transport in Malaysia
