= Ayer Baloi =

Mukim in Pontian, Johor, Malaysia

- Mukim
- Ayer Baloi in Pontian District
- Coordinates: 1°36′33.6″N 103°20′35.0″E
- Country: Malaysia
- State: Johor
- District: Pontian

Area
  - Total: 142 km^{2} (55 sq mi)

Ayer Baloi is a mukim in Pontian District, Johor, Malaysia.

== Geography ==
The mukim spans over an area of 142 km^{2}.

== See also ==
- Geography of Malaysia
