= Malaysia Federal Route 362 =

Road in Malaysia

Federal Route 362
- Jalan Seremban–Labu–Nilai

Route information
- Maintained by Malaysian Public Works Department
- Length: 19.26 km (11.97 mi)

Major junctions
- North end: Nilai
- FT 3265 Federal Route 3265; FT 1265 Federal Route 1265; North–South Expressway Southern Route / AH2; FT 241 Federal Route 241
- South end: Seremban

Location
- Country: Malaysia
- Primary destinations: Labu, Tiroi, Bandar Ainsdale

Highway system
- Highways in Malaysia; Expressways; Federal; State

Federal Route 362, Jalan Seremban–Labu–Nilai (formerly Negeri Sembilan State Route N38), is a federal road in Negeri Sembilan, Malaysia. Prio to the North-South Expressway, this road was the main road connecting Nilai to Seremban. Even with the expressway, this road is still the main route serving Labu, Tiroi and Bandar Ainsdale.

The Kilometre Zero is located at Seremban.

At most sections, the Federal Route 362 was built under the JKR R5 road standard, with a speed limit of 90 km/h (56 mph).

== Junction lists ==
The entire route is located in Seremban District, Negeri Sembilan.

Legend:

- I/C - Interchange, I/S - Intersection, RSA - Rest and service area, OBR - Overhead bridge restaurant, R/R - Restaurant and rest plaza, L/B - Layby, V/P - Vista point, TN - tunnel, T/P - Toll plaza, BR - Bridge
- C - Cloverleaf, S - Stack, T-A - Trumpet-A, T-B - Trumpet-B, DT - Directional-T/Y, SDT - Semi-Directional-T/Y, P-Y - Partial-Y, D - Diamond, P-C - Partial cloverleaf, D-D - Diverging diamond, D-R - Direct ramp

Location	km	mi	Name	Destinations	Notes
Nilai	19.26	11.97	Nilai	FT 3265 Malaysia Federal Route 3265 – Salak Tinggi, Dengkil, Kuala Lumpur International Airport (KLIA), Bandar Baru Nilai, Pajam, Mantin, Seremban; North–South Expressway Southern Route / AH2 – Kuala Lumpur, Johor Bahru	T-junctions
Nilai			Sepang Road		
Nilai			Railway crossing bridge		
Labu			Kampung Kondok		
Labu			Sungai Kondok bridge		
Labu			Kampung Labu Hilir		
Labu			Kampung Pulau	Jalan Kampung Pulau	
Labu			NLE Expressway	Nilai–Labu–Enstek Expressway	
Labu			Kampung Lambar		
Labu			Labu	Labu Komuter station	
Labu			Railway crossing bridge		
Labu			Sungai Batang Labu bridge		
Labu			Labu	Labu Komuter station	
Labu			Labu	FT 1265 Malaysia Federal Route 1265 – FELDA LB Johnson, Bandar Enstek, Mambau, Port Dickson	T-junctions
Labu			Kampung Batu 9		
Labu			Kampung Labu Ulu		
Labu			Kampung Masjid		
Labu			Kampung Batu Seri		
Labu			Kampung Pasir Puteh		
Labu			SMAP Labu	Sekolah Menengah Agama Persekutuan Labu	
Tiroi			Tiroi	Tiroi Komuter station	
Bandar Ainsdale			Sekolah Bersepadu Kemayan		
Bandar Ainsdale			Bandar Ainsdale; Bandar Ainsdale-NSE	North–South Expressway Southern Route / AH2 – Kuala Lumpur, Johor Bahru; Persiaran Ainsdale Selatan – Seremban 2, S2 Heights, Sendayan	Junctions
Bandar Ainsdale			Bandar Ainsdale		
Bukit Kepayang			Taman Bukit Kepayang	Taman Bukit Kepayang; Malaysia Civil Defence Force (JPA3) Negeri Sembilan state headquarters	
Bukit Kepayang			Taman Labu Utama		
Seremban	0.00	0.00	Seremban	FT 241 Malaysia Federal Route 241 – City Centre, Bukit Nenas; North–South Expressway Southern Route / AH2 – Kuala Lumpur, Johor Bahru	Diamond Interchange
1.000 mi = 1.609 km; 1.000 km = 0.621 mi: Unopened
