= Malaysia Federal Route 195 =

Road in Malaysia

Federal Route 195
- Seremban–Bandar Baru Enstek Highway / Seremban–Bukit Nenas Highway / KLIA Linkage

Route information
- Maintained by Malaysian Public Works Department
- Length: 13.0 km (8.1 mi)
- Existed: 1995–present
- History: Completed in 2019

Major junctions
- West end: Bandar Enstek
- FT 1265 Federal Route 1265; N68 Jalan Kampung Gadong; FT 241 Jalan Sungai Ujong
- East end: Seremban; Seremban 2 interchange

Location
- Country: Malaysia
- Primary destinations: Bukit Nenas, Labu, Seremban 2, Bandar Sri Sendayan, Nilai, Sepang, Kuala Lumpur International Airport (KLIA)

Highway system
- Highways in Malaysia; Expressways; Federal; State

The Seremban–Bandar Baru Enstek Highway, also known as the KLIA Linkage, designated as Federal Route 195, is a major highway in Negeri Sembilan, Malaysia which connects Seremban to Bandar Enstek. It is also a main route to the North–South Expressway Southern Route via Seremban Interchange, as well as providing a direct connection between the city with the Kuala Lumpur International Airport.

In 2012, the stretch of the highway from Seremban 2 to Bandar Sri Sendayan was upgraded into dual-carriageway. It was completed in 2014.

The previous Kilometre Zero is located at Bukit Nenas Toxic Waste Disposal Facilities, as the newest extension to Bandar Enstek was completed in 2019.

There is a pipeline crossing tunnel near Seremban 2.

At most sections, the Federal Route 195 was built under the JKR R5 road standard, allowing maximum speed limit of up to 90 km/h.

== Junction lists ==
The entire route is located in Seremban District, Negeri Sembilan.

Location	km	mi	Exit	Name	Destinations	Notes
Bukit Nenas			Bukit Nenas Toxic Waste Disposal Facilities			
Bukit Nenas			19501	Bukit Nenas; Bukit Nenas I/S	FT 1265 Malaysia Federal Route 1265 – Labu, Nilai, Sepang, Kuala Lumpur International Airport (KLIA), Mambau, Port Dickson	Junctions
Bandar Sri Sendayan				Taman Idaman Villa	Persiaran Metro Sendayan	T-junctions
Bandar Sri Sendayan			19502	Bandar Sri Sendayan I/C	N68 Jalan Kampung Gadong – Bandar Sri Sendayan, Kampung Gadong, Mambau	Diamond interchange
Seremban				Taman Mantau Indah		Diamond interchange
Seremban			Pipeline crossing tunnel			
Seremban			19503	Seremban; Seremban 2 I/C	FT 241 Jalan Sungai Ujong – Seremban City Centre; North–South Expressway Southern Route / AH2 – Kuala Lumpur, Johor Bahru; Persiaran Seremban 2 – Seremban 2	Interchange
1.000 mi = 1.609 km; 1.000 km = 0.621 mi

== See also ==
- Paroi–Senawang–KLIA Expressway, a proposed tolled counterpart
