= Batang Benar =

Town in Negeri Sembilan, Malaysia

Coordinates: 2°51′N 101°49′E

Batang Benar (Negeri Sembilan Malay: Batang Bona, Jawi: باتڠ بنار) is a small town in Seremban District, Negeri Sembilan, Malaysia. It is located near Negeri Sembilan-Selangor border. The nearest big town to Batang Benar is Nilai.

== Transportation ==
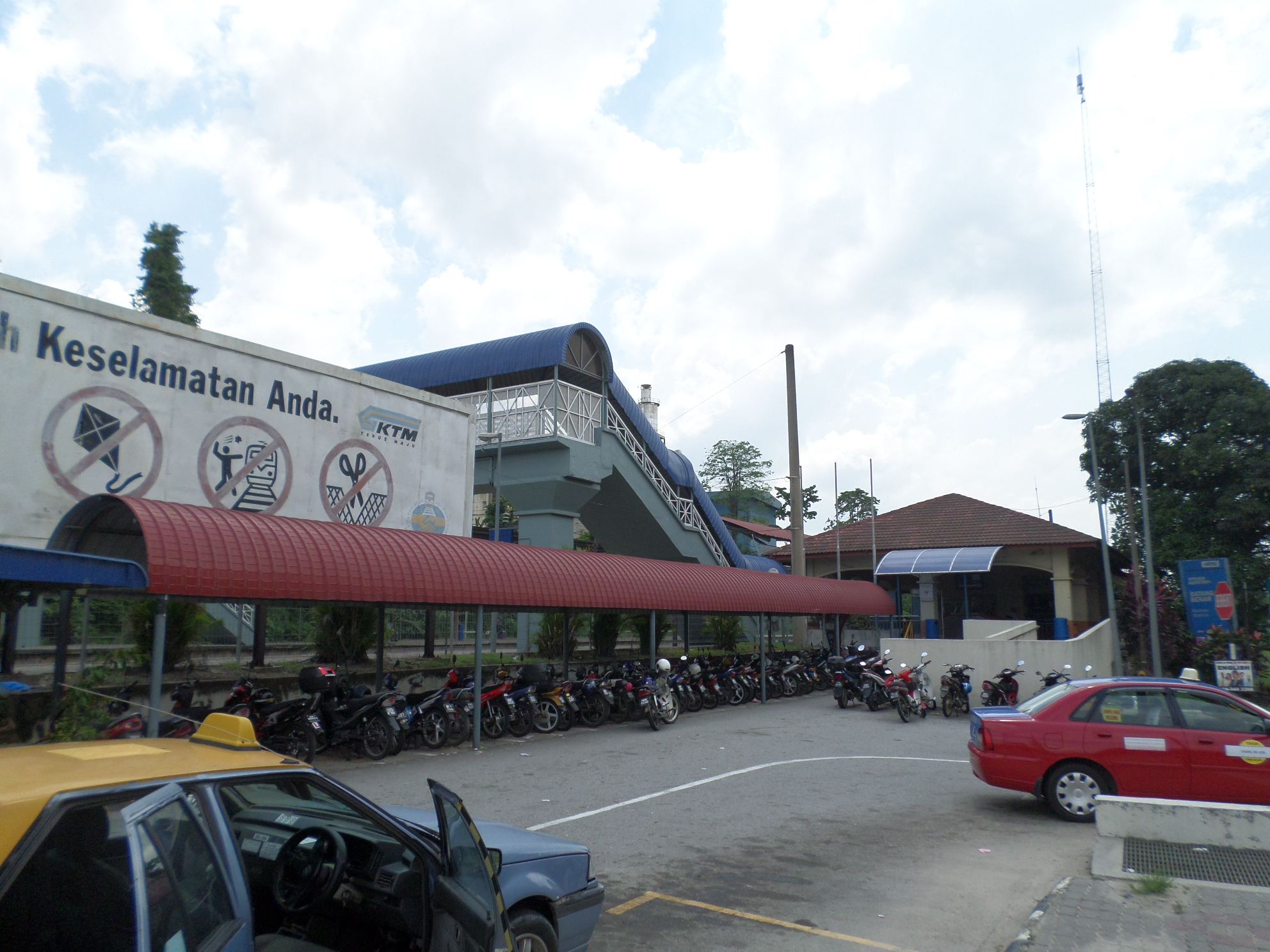
Batang Benar Komuter station

Batang Benar is linked to Seremban via KTM Komuter Batang Benar Komuter station.
