= Mambau National Secondary School =

- Sekolah Menengah Kebangsaan Mambau
- Mambau, Seremban, Negeri Sembilan; Malaysia

Information
- Type: Government secondary school
- Motto: Berilmu, Berjaya, Berbakti (Knowledgeable, Successful, Service)
- Established: 1989
- Founder: Pn. Peter Lee Nee Pamela Ching Shoo Peng
- Principal: En Abd Halim Bin Md Yunus
- Grades: Form 1 - Form 5
- Enrollment: 1124
- Affiliations: Malaysia Ministry Of Education
- Abbreviation: Mambau
- Website: http://www.smkmambau.edu.my/smkm/

Mambau National Secondary School (Malay: Sekolah Menengah Kebangsaan Mambau) is a national secondary school which was opened in 1989. The school is located in Mambau, Seremban District, Negeri Sembilan, Malaysia.

== History ==
The school was opened in December 1989. It was built within a 23-hectare (57-acre) compound with a budget of RM 2.1 million. SMK Mambau started as a B-grade school with only 163 students enrolled.

== Background ==
SMK Mambau is situated within the district of Seremban. The students of the school are hailed from localities such as Kampung Baru Mambau, Kampung Batu Tiga, Kampung Mantau, Taman Angsamas, Taman Kelab Tuanku, Taman Seri Mambau, Kampung Bemban, Bandar Sri Sendayan and Bandar Springhill, with the latter is the only one situated in Port Dickson District. By 2001, SMK Mambau comprised five building blocks, science labs and a workshop on Living Skills.

== Notable alumni ==
- Ahmad Nabil Ahmad - actor, winner of the second season of Raja Lawak Astro
