= SMK Seremban 2 =

Sekolah Menengah Kebangsaan Seremban 2
- Seremban, Negeri Sembilan; Malaysia

Information
- Type: Fully Government
- Motto: Beramal, Berilmu, Bertaqwa
- Established: 6 January 2003
- Principal: PN HJH NORMANIDA BINTI ABD RAHMAN A.N.S
- Grades: Form 1 to Form 5
- Enrollment: 1353
- Affiliations: Malaysia Ministry Of Education
- Abbreviation: SMK S2
- Website: https://sites.google.com/moe-dl.edu.my/smkseremban2/home

Sekolah Menengah Kebangsaan Seremban 2 (SMK S2, Seremban 2 Secondary School) is a secondary school in Malaysia. It is located in Seremban 2, Negeri Sembilan, next to the Green Street Homes and about 7 kilometers from Seremban town. It was completed in mid-December 2002 and became fully operational on January 6, 2003.

The school has a total of 424 students, 29 teachers and 6 support staff. Datin Maznah Bt Yusof is the school's first principal.

It has its own council, known as the House Ungku Aziz, officially opened by Royal Professor Ungku Aziz. The school is also equipped with a field and a running track, where sporting events and other activities such as the State Patriotism Week have been held.

== See also ==
- List of schools in Malaysia
