= Pajam =

Town in Malaysia

Coordinates: 2°51′N 101°51′E

Pajam is a small town in Negeri Sembilan, Malaysia.
