= SMK Undang Jelebu =

Secondary school in Negeri Sembilan, Malaysia

Sekolah Menengah Kebangsaan Undang Jelebu

Location
- 71600 Kuala Klawang; Malaysia
- Coordinates: 2°57′13″N 102°03′30″E

Information
- Type: National School
- Motto: Knowledge is Powerful
- Opened: 1983
- School district: Jelebu
- Principal: Tuan Mahat bin Bujang
- Faculty: 40 teachers
- Gender: Boys & Girls
- Age: 13 to 17/18
- Website: smkundangjelebu.blogspot.com

Sekolah Menengah Kebangsaan Undang Jelebu known also as SMK Undang Jelebu, is a secondary school located in Jelebu District, Negeri Sembilan, Malaysia. In 2009, Sekolah Menengah Kebangsaan Undang Jelebu had 840 pupils: 449 boys and 391 girls, and employed 61 teachers.
