= Nilai Komuter station =

Railway station in Nilai, Malaysia

Nilai

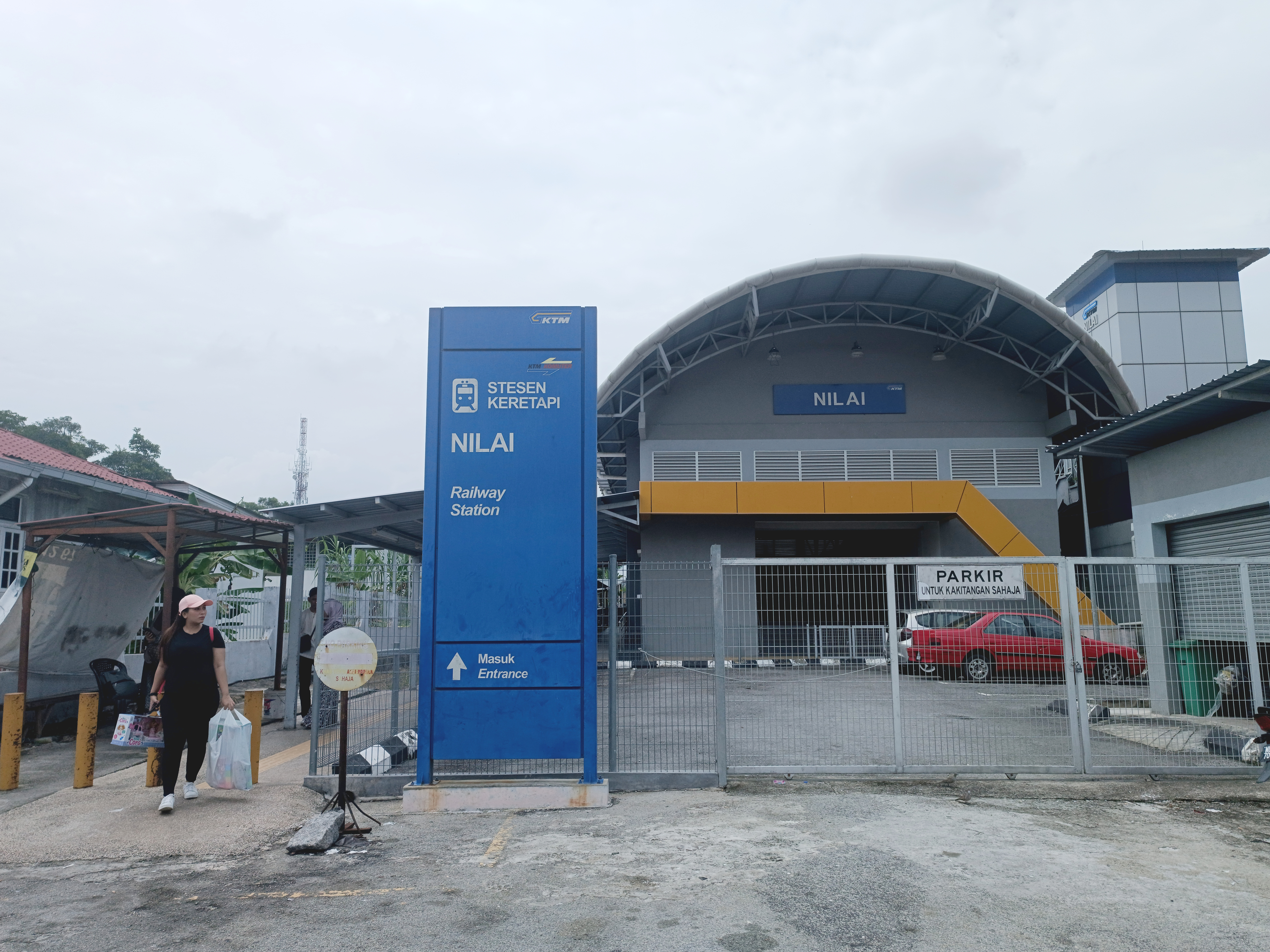
- The expanded station building at the Nilai commuter Station

General information
- Other names: Malay: نيلاي (Jawi); Chinese: 汝来; Tamil: நீலாய்
- Location: Nilai, Negeri Sembilan, Malaysia.
- Coordinates: 2°48′8″N 101°47′58″E
- System: KB10 | Commuter rail station
- Owner: Railway Assets Corporation
- Operator: Keretapi Tanah Melayu
- Line: West Coast Line
- Platforms: 2 side platforms
- Tracks: 2

Construction
- Structure type: At-grade
- Parking: Available
- Accessible: Yes

Other information
- Station code: KB10

History
- Opened: 1903
- Rebuilt: 1995
- Electrified: 1995
- Former names: Sepang Road; Sepang Road & Nilai

Services
Preceding station	Keretapi Tanah Melayu (Komuter)	Following station
Batang Benar towards Batu Caves	Batu Caves–Pulau Sebang Line	Labu towards Pulau Sebang/Tampin
Location

Nilai Komuter station is a KTM Komuter train station, situated close to and named after the old town of Nilai, Negeri Sembilan. The station strictly serves as a two-platform train halt for the Seremban Line KTM Komuter train service. This used to be a stop for the KTM ETS service when the line was extended to Gemas in 2015.

== Design ==
The station started during the British era as Sepang Road halt. The station, as are virtually all small train halts along the Komuter lines, is situated along a double tracked right-of-way. Due to its use as a connection from the KLIA, as well as colleges a distance away, the station receives a substantially large number of passengers throughout its operational hours.

Initially consisting of a small station building with one operational ticket counter and two ticket vending machines, and covered platforms, the station has since undergone significant improvements in 2005 and 2006 to support more passengers.

The station used to be a stop for the ETS service when it was extended to Gemas in 2015. Eventually, the station was no longer served by ETS.

== Interchange ==
The station is notable as a link to Sepang, where the Sepang International Circuit and the Kuala Lumpur International Airport (KLIA) are situated. For the former, tents and additional ticket counters are usually prepared in anticipation of an increased influx of passengers during the Malaysian leg of the Formula One tournament.

Prior to the completion of the Express Rail Link (ERL), the Nilai station was the only connecting railway station to the KLIA. KLIA-bound bus services, which typically take up to an hour to reach the airport from Nilai or vice versa, are provided for passengers. Travel to the airport from KL Sentral via Nilai is still cheaper than via ERL services, although much slower. Buses were previously stationed directly in front of the train station before a proper bus depot was completed down the road.

== Future interchange ==
Nilai station has been slated as a future interchange station with the East Coast Rail Link.

== See also ==
- Rail transport in Malaysia
