= Kampung LBJ =

Human settlement in Negeri Sembilan, Malaysia

Coordinates: 2.7280354°N 101.7751736°E

Kampung LB Johnson (also known as Kampung LBJ) formerly LKTP Labu Jaya, FELDA LB Johnson and Felda LBJ, is a settlement village located in the Seremban District of Negeri Sembilan, Malaysia. Once a Felda settlement, the village is strategically located near the Kuala Lumpur International Airport, Putrajaya and the nearby Bandar Enstek.

Established as Felda Labu Jaya in 1961, the settlement was named after Lyndon B. Johnson, the then-President of the United States, who visited the settlement on 30 October 1966. Following Johnson's visit, the settlement was renamed FELDA LB Johnson as a tribute to his presence.

In 1996, the Negeri Sembilan Development Corporation and Tabung Haji "acquired the land from the settlers to build the state’s technology corridor", where the settlers receive a payout of RM 47 million; each receive between RM 1.2 million to RM 2 million, hence earning its nickname "the millionaire village".

The village itself has a primary school and a mosque, both named after Johnson.

== See also ==
- FELDA Soeharto
