= North–South Expressway Southern Route =

Major interstate expressway in Malaysia

Expressway 2
- North–South Expressway Southern Route; Lebuhraya Utara–Selatan Jajaran Selatan 南北大道南段
- NSE Southern Section in red

Route information
- Part of AH2 (Nilai North–Pandan-Tebrau)
- Maintained by PLUS Expressways
- Length: 312 km (194 mi)
- Existed: 1981–present
- History: Completed in 1994

Major junctions
- North end: Kuala Lumpur–Seremban Expressway at Seri Kembangan, Selangor
- Sungai Besi Expressway; Kajang Dispersal Link Expressway; North–South Expressway Central Link / AH2; FT 32 Federal Route 32; FT 241 Jalan Sungai Ujong; FT 53 Federal Route 53; FT 243 Senawang–NSE Road; FT 19 AMJ Highway; FT 143 Ayer Keroh Highway; FT 23 Federal Route 23; FT 24 Federal Route 24; FT 50 Federal Route 50; FT 96 Federal Route 96 Second Link Expressway / AH143 FT 1 / AH142 Federal Route 1 FT 1 Skudai Highway; FT 17 Pasir Gudang Highway FT 3 / AH18 Tebrau Highway
- South end: Johor Bahru Eastern Dispersal Link Expressway / AH2 at Pandan, Johor Bahru

Location
- Country: Malaysia
- Primary destinations: Kuala Lumpur, Seremban, Malacca City, Muar, Batu Pahat, Johor Bahru

Highway system
- Highways in Malaysia; Expressways; Federal; State

The North–South Expressway Southern Route (Malay: Lebuhraya Utara–Selatan Jajaran Selatan; Chinese: 南北大道南段) is an interstate controlled-access highway running parallel to the southwestern coast of Peninsular Malaysia. The expressway forms the south section of the North–South Expressway, connecting the states of Selangor, Negeri Sembilan, Malacca and Johor. It begins at Seri Kembangan, near the state/territory boundary between Selangor and Kuala Lumpur, and travels southwards to end at Pandan-Tebrau in Johor.

The expressway is the third longest in Peninsular Malaysia, after its northern counterpart and the East Coast Expressway.

The Kilometre Zero of the entire expressway is located at the Pandan Interchange with the Johor Bahru Eastern Dispersal Link Expressway.

== Route background ==
=== Sungai Besi to Nilai North ===
The expressway begins at the Sungai Besi toll plaza. The Kuala Lumpur–Seremban Expressway links Sungai Besi toll plaza to Jalan Istana and the Besraya Expressway near the Sungai Besi RMAF base. This section is a six-lane carriageway and serves the southwestern part of Klang Valley, passing by a few major towns.

The expressway connects to Universiti Putra Malaysia via UPM Interchange, which also provides connection to other nearby suburban towns like Seri Kembangan via Besraya and Putrajaya via SKVE as well as Universiti Tenaga Nasional (UNITEN) nearby. Kajang interchange however is an interchange with Kajang SILK E18 on their Country Heights Interchange, before connecting it to Kajang town and the rest of E18 network. Bangi Interchange connects to Bandar Baru Bangi township and National University of Malaysia (UKM). The newly-built Southville City Interchange links to Federal Route 31 (Banting-Kajang Route), which provides access to Dengkil and Semenyih after passing the Southville City new developments. Putra Mahkota, the last interchange of the Selangor part of the route, connects to Bandar Seri Putra housing developments. The state border of Selangor-Negeri Sembilan follows after.

This section only has laybys on Serdang and Nilai, with Nilai southbound also providing access to Nilai Memorial Park. However, what makes them different from other laybys is the food stall buildings are also present in these laybys, which makes their function similar to rest areas.

=== Nilai North to Seremban ===
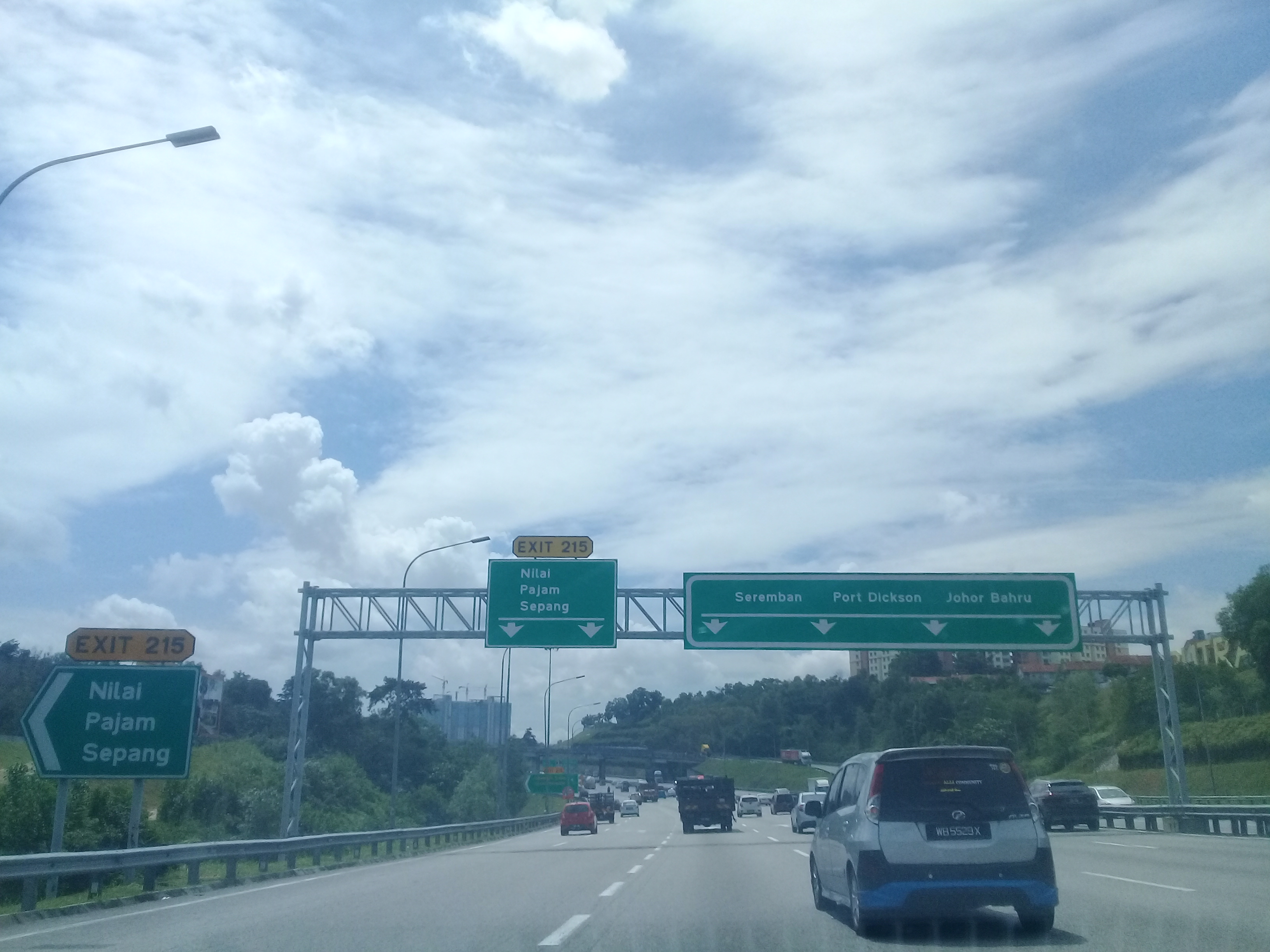
Nilai Interchange.

From this point the expressway enters Negeri Sembilan, running southwesterly towards Nilai. The interchange to ELITE E6 lies in the northern part of Nilai, near the Selangor–Negeri Sembilan border, enabling motorists from the south to Shah Alam and Klang while bypassing Kuala Lumpur. This section has been widened to an eight-lane carriageway to accommodate heavy traffic.

Nilai interchange gives access to Bandar Baru Nilai and Nilai 3 business centre. The expressway later continues to cross on Recron factory, quarries and estates and also the northernmost rest area of the route which is Seremban R&R. The latter only continues to Bandar Ainsdale Interchange, which links to Bandar Ainsdale new developments as well serving as the new northernmost interchange to Seremban. The Seremban Interchange provides direct access to Seremban city centre and also closes the gap between the expressway and Federal Route 1.

=== Seremban to Senawang ===
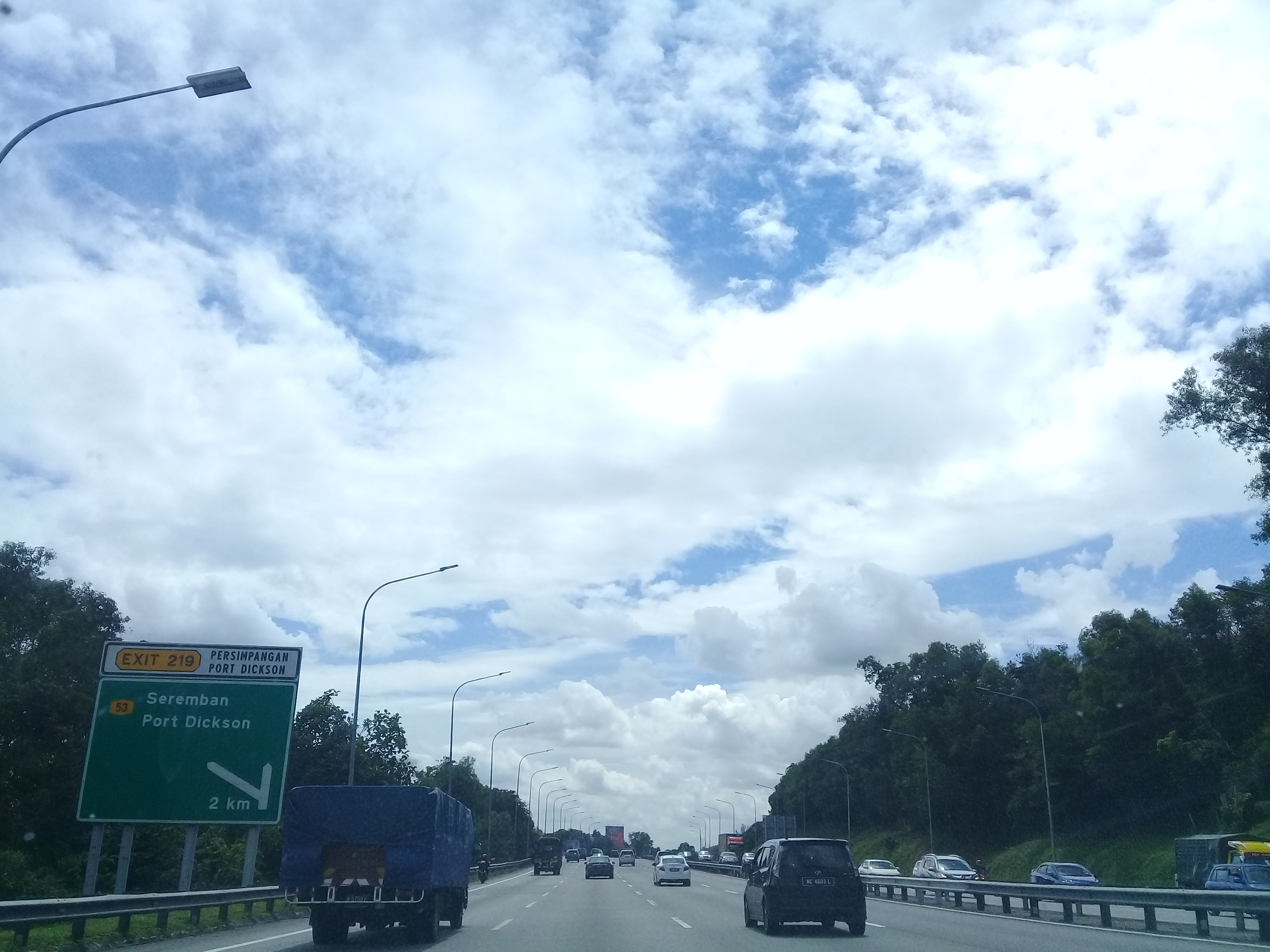
Port Dickson Interchange

This section links to Seremban City proper and Senawang. Between this section, there's Port Dickson interchange, which isn't connecting the expressway to Port Dickson town, but rather the Seremban-Port Dickson E29 expressway, which itself isn't directly connected to the expressway, but rather on the westward stretch of Federal Route 53 linked. The eight-lane dual-carriageway continues on this section. Senawang Interchange serves as southernmost interchange of Seremban area, which connects Senawang and Seremban Jaya residential areas. The route continues to run parallel to Federal Route 1.

=== Senawang to Ayer Keroh ===
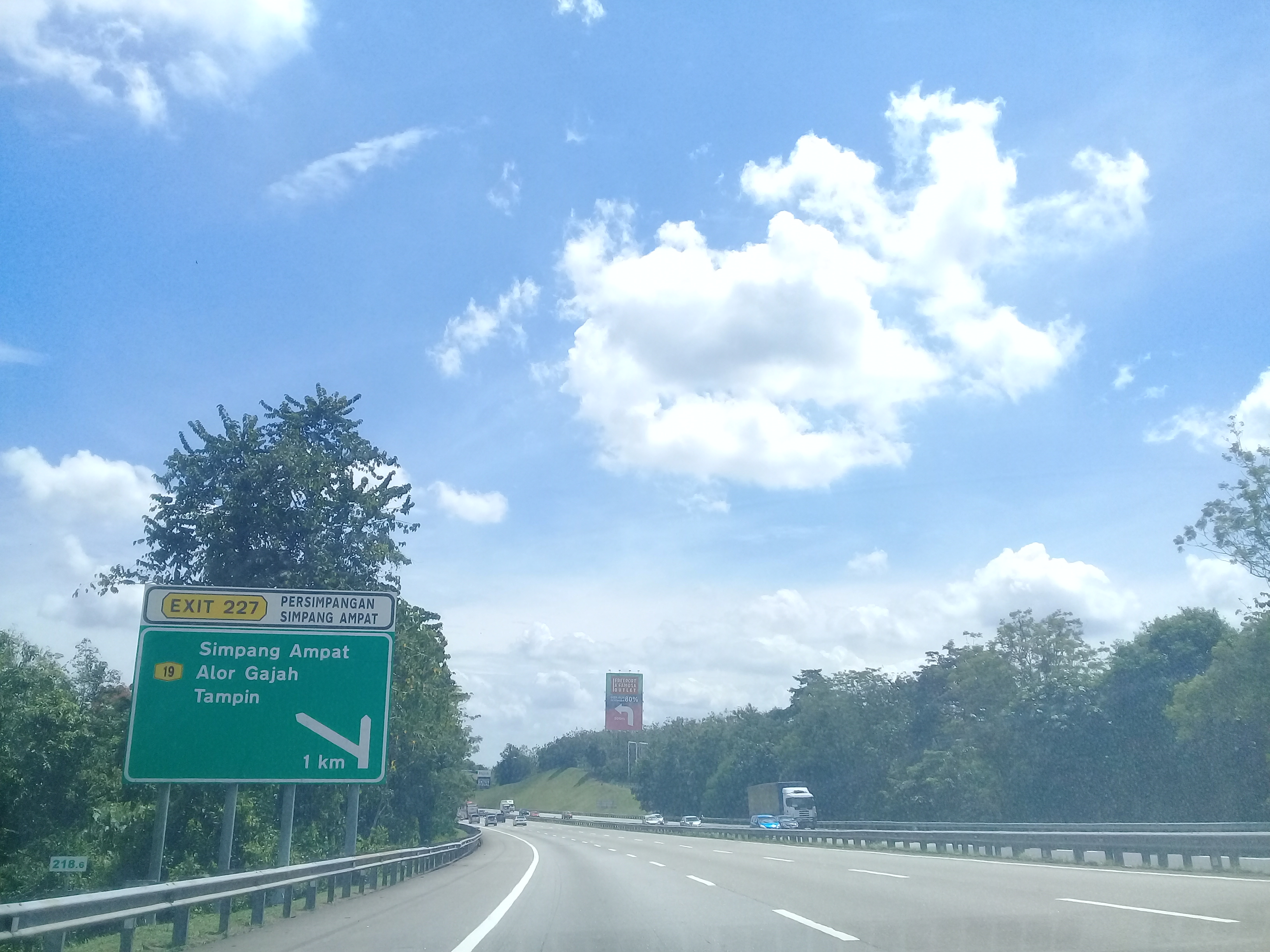
Simpang Ampat Interchange

The expressway returns to a six-lane dual-carriageway with lanes are divided with a line of trees. This is the section where the route started back to distance from Federal Route 1 as the expressway routes into Malacca.

Malacca-Negeri Sembilan border is situated a few kilometers before Simpang Ampat Interchange, and as the exit provides access to Simpang Ampat and Tampin nearby, it also being the last serving close connection to Federal Route 1 before both started to distance between them, with FT1 goes southeast, and E2 goes southwest into Malacca and run parallel, but distant from Lebuh AMJ FT19. Ayer Keroh is the only interchange that links close to the state's central areas, with a few kilometres north lies the only overhead restaurant of E2 which shares the same name.

=== Ayer Keroh to Pagoh ===
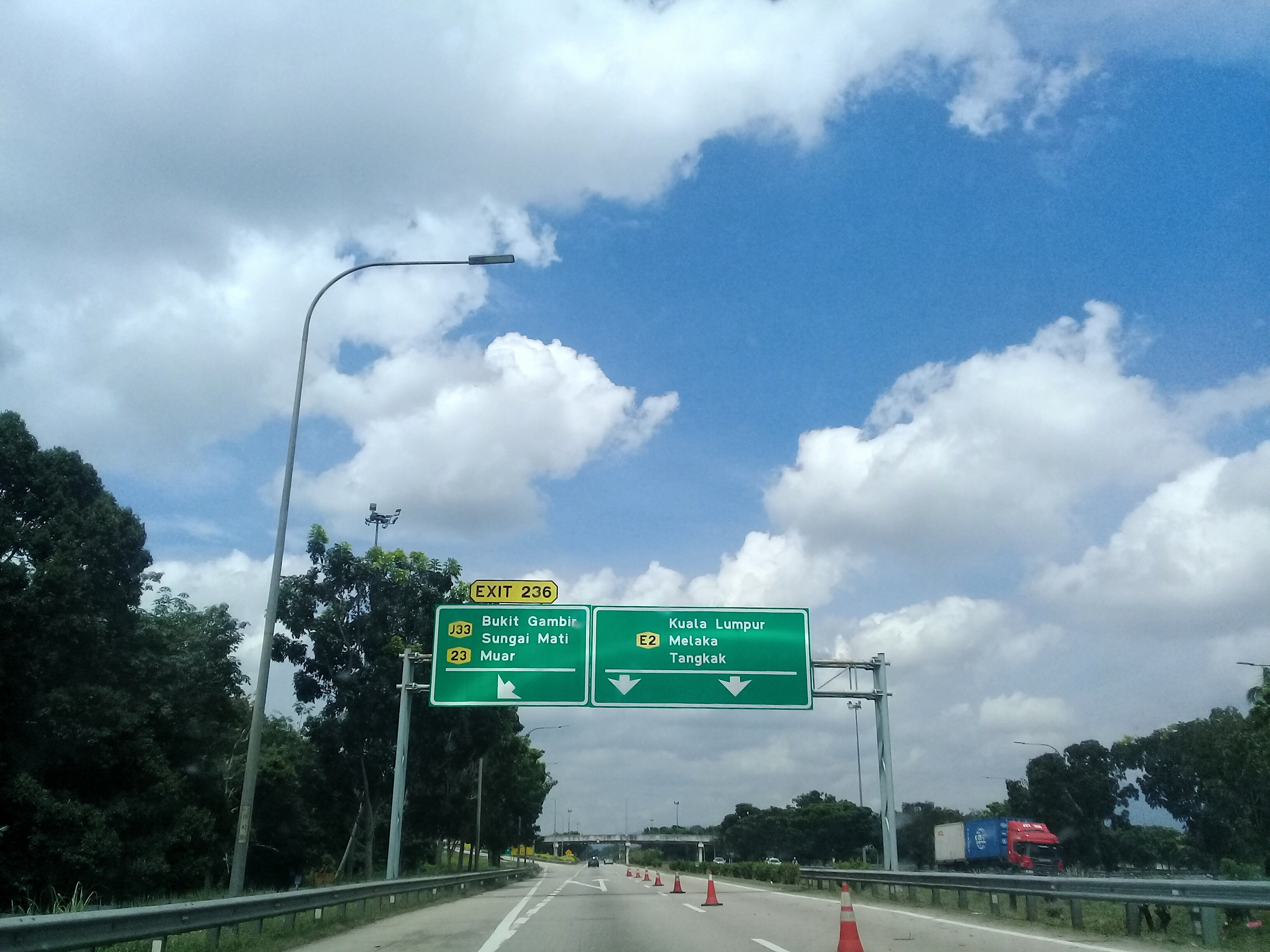
Bukit Gambir Interchange

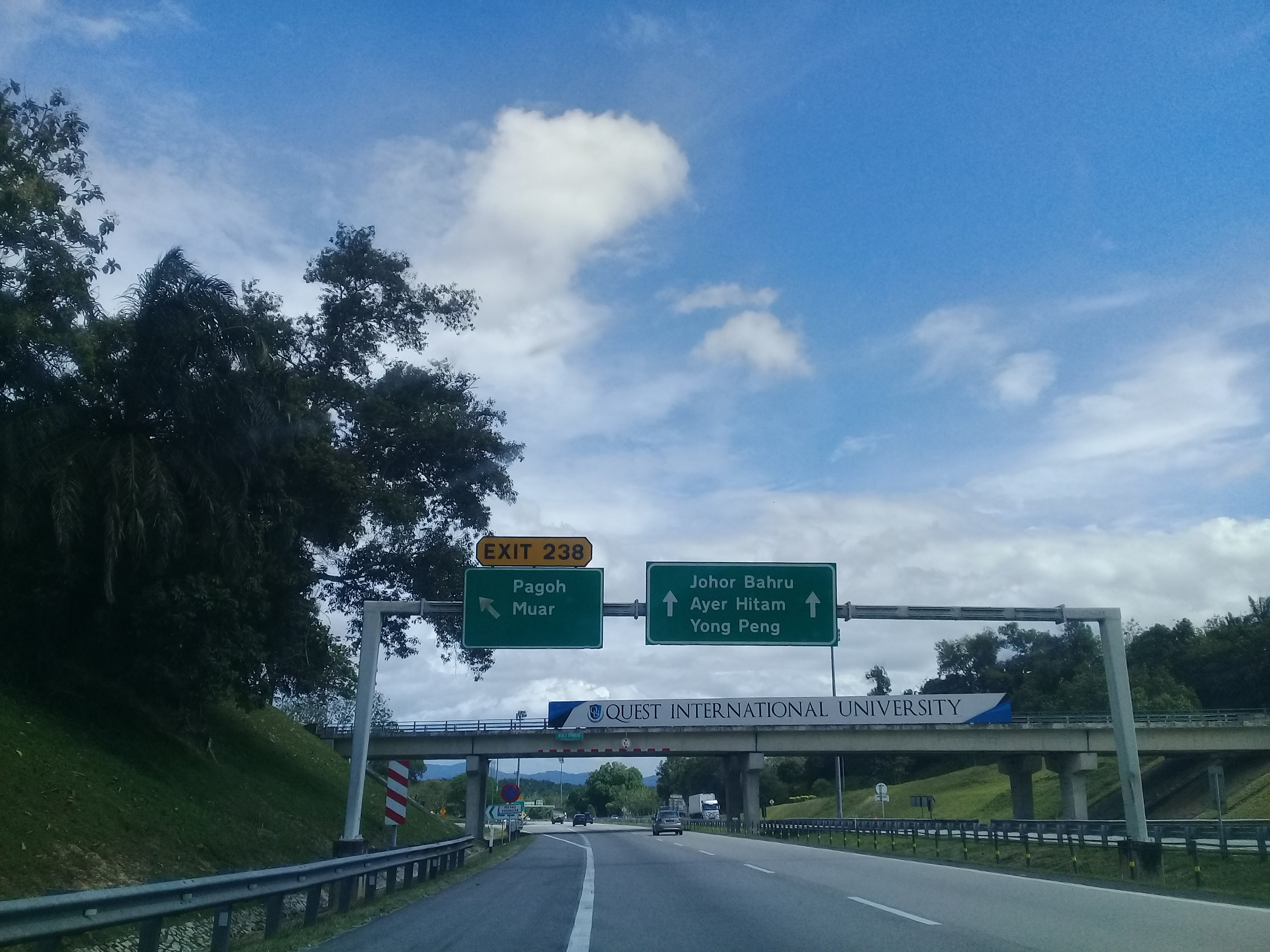
Pagoh Interchange

The expressway becomes a four-lane dual-carriageway expressway. Along this section, the divider between lanes is decorated with flower trees instead. This is also the section where only the concrete pavement is done on this route, particularly between Ayer Keroh - Jasin part.

The route started to go on its own route as FT19 became more distant and therefore ending after Malacca border, yet still so far with FT1 to close with. Past Sungai Kesang (Johor-Malacca border), the northernmost Johor exit is Tangkak, which aside from connecting to the textile border town, connects on FT23 which gives connection to major northwest towns of Johor, particularly close to Muar and further to Segamat. Both Bukit Gambir and Pagoh exits also provide connection to Muar.

The northbound Pagoh R&R is also situated here.

=== Pagoh to Skudai ===
The longest distance between two interchanges of the entire expressway lies in this section on Pagoh interchange to Yong Peng North interchange, a 42.98 km distance between both interchanges. As it also passes through Mount Maokil and surrounding hilly areas, a climbing lane is established on the section.

The expressway finally connects to the Federal Route 1 directly via Yong Peng South exit, and going southbound both route runs back close in parallel until the terminus. Ayer Hitam interchange also connects to Federal Route 50, the central Johor main road which links the west coast and east coast part of the state from Batu Pahat to Mersing via Kluang as well as the ceramic town itself.

The southernmost rest area for the whole expressway lies in Machap, just 2 kilometres from the Machap exit.

The route then enters the Iskandar Johor corridor starting from Kulai interchange, which led towards Kulai town.

The Senai North interchange links the expressway to the Second Link Expressway E3, which allow motorists a direct access to the Malaysia-Singapore Second Link Bridge to Tuas, Singapore, as well as connecting Senai airport areas before going southwest. The main route goes straight to Johor Bahru proper.

=== Skudai to Johor Bahru ===
Closed toll fares begin and end on Skudai toll plaza, with Kempas toll plaza uses an open-toll collection system. The route continues to be linked parallel to Federal Route 1, with Skudai giving main access to Skudai town centre before going southeast to serve a few towns in Iskandar Puteri and Johor Bahru city areas. The route is also linked to Pasir Gudang Highway (FT17) on Pasir Gudang Interchange.

On the last segment, the expressway finally terminates at its interchange with the Johor Bahru Eastern Dispersal Link Expressway and is also the only part which links the route with Federal Route 3, the peninsular East Coast backbone. Both routes go down to the city centre and link to the Johor Causeway.

== Speed limits ==
Most of the expressway enforces a maximum speed limit of 110 km/h (68 mph). Signed exceptions include:

- 60 km/h (37 mph) when approaching any toll plaza
- 90 km/h (56 mph) from Sungai Besi to Bangi

There are no signed minimum speed limits.

== Features ==
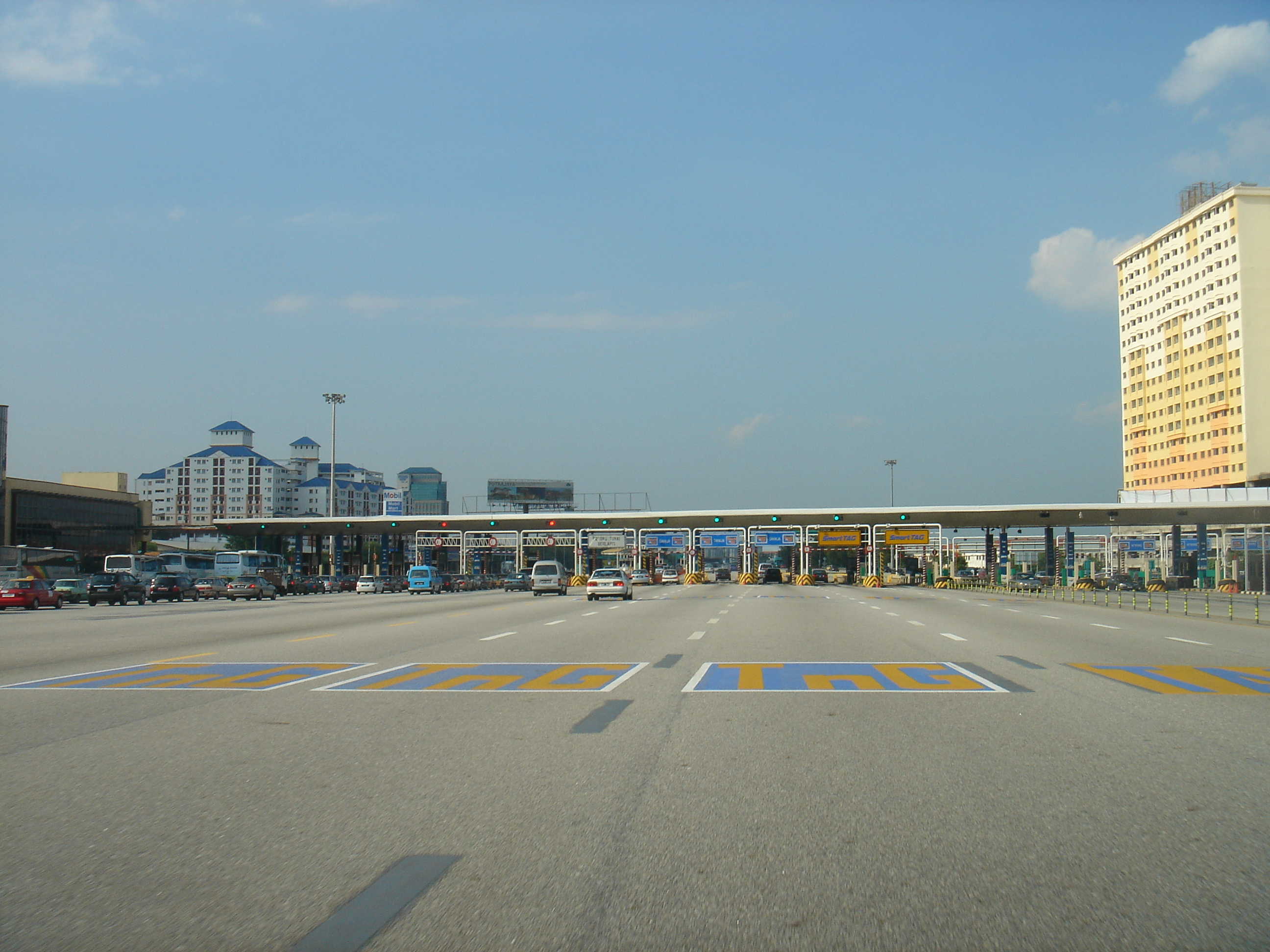
Sungai Besi Toll Plaza, North–South Expressway (Malaysia)

The Sungai Besi toll plaza has the second highest number of toll booths in Malaysia, thus making the stretch of highway at the Sungai Besi toll plaza the second widest road in Malaysia with more than 18 lanes (excluding additional toll booths) before Batu Kawan toll plaza at Sultan Abdul Halim Muadzam Shah Bridge (Penang Second Bridge) which has 28 lanes. The Pagoh–Yong Peng (North) section is the longest stretch of the North–South Expressway network. This 43-kilometre stretch passes Mount Maokil and the plains of Seri Medan and Sungai Sarang Buaya.

== Tolls ==
Most of the expressway maintains a ticket system (closed system) of tolling. The expressway however also has one toll plaza using the barrier toll system (open system) at Kempas. The ticket system from Skudai northwards uses an integrated system of tolling that also applies to the North–South Expressway Central Link, New Klang Valley Expressway and North–South Expressway Northern Route (e.g. it is possible to travel from Skudai, Johor on this expressway to Juru, Penang on the North–South Expressway Northern Route without leaving the toll system). The toll rate for the ticket system for passenger cars excluding taxis as of 2011 is 13.6 sen per kilometre.

=== Toll rates ===
==== Closed toll systems ====
Calculated below is maximum rate between Skudai and Sungai Besi, the furthest ends of this section closed system.

Class	Type of vehicles	Rate (in Malaysian Ringgit (RM))
0	Motorcycles	Free
1	Vehicles with 2 axles and 3 or 4 wheels excluding taxis	RM 33.21
2	Vehicles with 2 axles and 5 or 6 wheels excluding buses	RM 60.70
3	Vehicles with 3 or more axles	RM 80.90
4	Taxis	RM 16.56
5	Buses	RM 24.85

==== Kempas Toll Plaza ====
Class	Type of vehicles	Rate (in Malaysian Ringgit (RM))
0	Motorcycles	Free
1	Vehicles with 2 axles and 3 or 4 wheels excluding taxis	RM 1.72
2	Vehicles with 2 axles and 5 or 6 wheels excluding buses	RM 3.20
3	Vehicles with 3 or more axles	RM 4.10
4	Taxis	RM 0.90
5	Buses	RM 1.14

== Services ==
=== Emergency assistance and information services ===
Orange emergency telephones/callboxes are located every two kilometres along the entire expressway, as with every other expressway in the PLUS expressway network. Alternatively, commuters may dial the toll-free number 1 800 88 0000 on their mobile phones. Both will connect to the PLUS traffic monitoring centre in Subang where commuters may request for traffic information or roadside assistance. The highway patrol and roadside assistance teams are known as PLUSRonda. They provide free first responder services including small fixes for broken down vehicles, towing and also act as traffic police when there is an incident. They are also given auxiliary police powers.

PLUS also provides traffic information to commuters through variable-message signs located on some sections of the expressway, and on Twitter @plustrafik in Malay. Major radio stations in Peninsular Malaysia also broadcast traffic updates for the expressway.

=== Rest areas ===
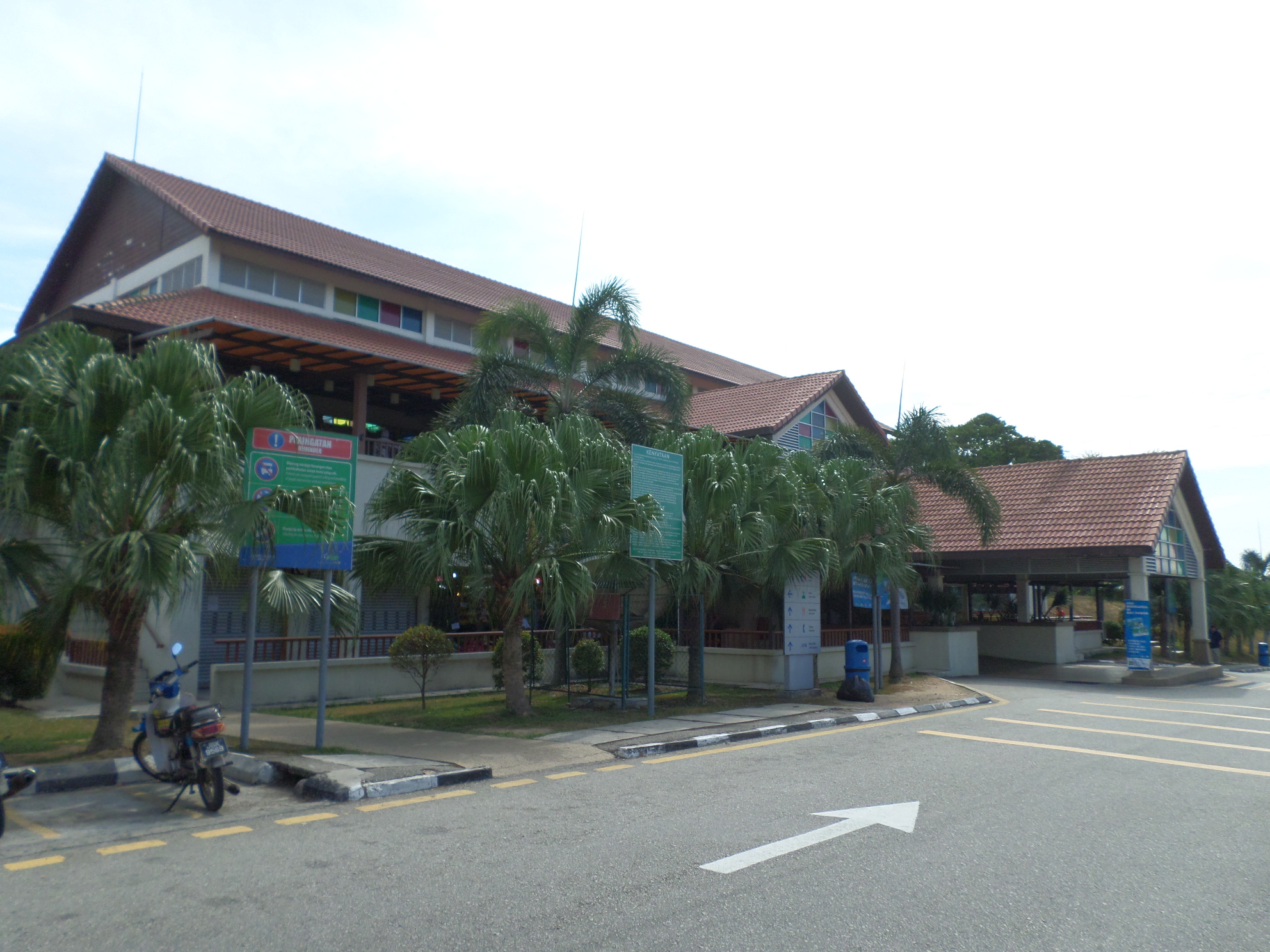
Pagoh Rest and Service Area

The North–South Expressway southern route has 8 full rest areas (which includes one overhead bridge restaurant), 20 laybys and one vista point (scenic area) total along both directions of the expressway. Every rest area and layby includes, as a bare minimum, car parks and public toilets. Most laybys also include public telephones and a small rest hut. Depending on location, laybys can also include petrol stations, a surau, and rarely, food courts, independently operated restaurants and automated teller machines. Full rest and service areas have all of the above services and are much larger, so they can accommodate more services. Several rest areas also have small inns, and most have complimentary Wi-Fi services. Vista points only have car parks and are meant for commuters to enjoy the scenery at that location. Laybys are found every 25 to 50 kilometres, while full rest areas are found every 80 to 100 kilometres. The only vista point on this expressway is in Pedas Linggi.

== History ==
Several infrastructures in the Johor state portion of the expressway were constructed by Konsorsium Citra Kontraktor Nusantara, a group of six Indonesian firms and Maha Bina Sdn Bhd of Malaysia. The consortium built a 20-km section of the expressway, two interchanges and 12 bridges.

=== Original route ===
The construction of the North-South Expressway includes the acquisition and upgrades of several major roads as follows:-

Highway shield	Roads	Sections
Kuala Lumpur–Seremban Expressway		Sungai Besi–Seremban

== Development ==
=== Six-lane widening works ===
The Senawang Interchange and the Ayer Keroh Interchange received new four lane sections in 2003. The Ayer Keroh Interchange had two-lane carriageways until 2009, when it was widened to three and four lanes, ending at Sungai Besi commencing again at E37 Kuala Lumpur–Seremban Expressway.

==== Phase 1: Seremban–Senawang ====
In July 2007, a six lane section from Kuala Lumpur to Seremban Interchange Exit 218 was extended to Senawang Interchange Exit 220.

==== Phase 2: Seremban–Ayer Keroh ====
The next phase of these works, the extension of the Senawang Interchange Exit 220 to the Ayer Keroh Interchange Exit 231 was completed in December 2007.

=== Fourth lane addition ===
In July 2010, the operator, PLUS Expressways Berhad, announced that the government had awarded contracts to build a fourth lane on a stretch from Nilai (North) to Seremban. The construction was completed in 2015.

=== Exit 236 Bukit Gambir Interchange ===
An interchange between Tangkak and Pagoh Interchange was opened to traffic on 26 January 2014, there will be three interchanges that will be linking from the interchanges to Muar, Johor.

=== Exit 217 Bandar Ainsdale (Seremban North) Interchange ===
An interchange between Nilai and Seremban Interchange was opened to traffic on 10 July 2015.

=== Exit 212A Southville City Interchange ===
An interchange between Bangi and Putra Mahkota Interchange was opened to traffic on 11 April 2018.

== Interchange lists ==
Legend:

- I/C - Interchange, I/S - Intersection, RSA - Rest and service area, OBR - Overhead bridge restaurant, R/R - Restaurant and rest plaza, L/B - Layby, V/P - Vista point, TN - tunnel, T/P - Toll plaza, BR - Bridge
- C - Cloverleaf, S - Stack, T-A - Trumpet-A, T-B - Trumpet-B, DT - Directional-T/Y, SDT - Semi-Directional-T/Y, P-Y - Partial-Y, D - Diamond, P-C - Partial cloverleaf, D-D - Diverging diamond, D-R - Direct ramp

State	District	km	Exit	Name	Destinations	No. of lanes	Speed limit (km/h)	Type	Notes
Through to Kuala Lumpur–Seremban Expressway
Selangor	Petaling	310.0	T/P	Sungai Besi Toll Plaza	Touch 'n Go Touch 'n Go SmartTAG SmartTAG MyRFID MyRFID SmartTAG SmartTAG Touch 'n Go Touch 'n Go	Six	60		
Selangor	Petaling	309.0	L/B	Sungai Besi L/B	Sungai Besi L/B – Shell	Six	90		Southbound
Selangor	Petaling		L/B	Shell L/B	Shell –	Six	90		Northbound
Selangor	Petaling	307.0	L/B	Serdang L/B	Serdang L/B –	Six	90		Southbound
Selangor	Petaling	307.0	L/B	Serdang L/B	Serdang L/B –	Six	90		Northbound
Selangor	Petaling		L/B	Petronas L/B	Petronas – TnG TAG Spot	Six	90		Southbound
Selangor	Hulu Langat	305.0	209	UPM I/C	Sungai Besi Expressway – Sungai Besi, Mines Resort City, Balakong, Kuala Lumpur, Cheras, Ampang Jaya, Genting Highlands, Bentong, Temerloh, Kuantan, Kuala Terengganu; Kajang Dispersal Link Expressway – Universiti Tenaga Nasional (Uniten), Putrajaya, Cyberjaya, Puchong; B13 Jalan Serdang – University of Putra Malaysia (UPM), Serdang, Seri Kembangan	Six	90	T-B	
Selangor	Hulu Langat	303.0	210	Kajang I/C	Kajang Dispersal Link Expressway – Kajang, Putrajaya, Cyberjaya, Puchong, Bandar Baru Bangi, Semenyih, Bandar Saujana Putra, Banting, Teluk Panglima Garang, Pulau Indah, Bangi Government and Private Training Centre Area	Six	90	T-A	
Selangor	Hulu Langat	297.0	212	Bangi I/C	Persiaran Pekeliling – Bandar Baru Bangi, Bangi, Dengkil, Semenyih, National University of Malaysia (UKM)	Six	90	T-B	
Selangor	Hulu Langat		BR	Sungai Langat bridge		Six	110		
Selangor	Hulu Langat			PLUS-Bangi I/C	Bangi–Putrajaya Expressway – Bangi, Putrajaya, Semenyih, Kajang	Six	110		Planned
Selangor	Hulu Langat	294.2	212A	Southville City I/C	Southville City-NSE Road – Southville City, Bangi, Dengkil, Kota Warisan, Sepang, Bandar Serenia, Semenyih	Six	110	DT	
Selangor	Hulu Langat		BR	Sungai Semenyih bridge		Six	110		
Selangor	Hulu Langat	289.0	213	Putra Mahkota I/C	Persiaran Putra Mahkota – Bandar Seri Putra (Putra Mahkota), Bukit Mahkota, Setia Alamsari, Nilai, Semenyih, Universiti Islam Selangor (UIS)	Six	110	T-B	
Negeri Sembilan	Seremban	287.6	L/B	Nilai Memorial Park	Nilai Memorial Park –	Six	110		Southbound
Negeri Sembilan	Seremban	287.0	L/B	Nilai L/B	Nilai L/B –	Six	110		Northbound
Negeri Sembilan	Seremban	286.5	L/B	Nilai L/B	Nilai L/B – BHPetrol	Six	110		Southbound
Negeri Sembilan	Seremban	284.5	214	Nilai North I/C	North–South Expressway Central Link / AH2 – Shah Alam, Subang Jaya, USJ, Putra Heights, Bandar Saujana Putra, Putrajaya, Cyberjaya, Bandar Serenia, Ipoh, Kuala Lumpur International Airport (KLIA), Kota Damansara, Klang, Damansara, Subang Airport	Eight	110	DT	Northern terminus of concurrency with AH2
Negeri Sembilan	Seremban	284.3	215	Nilai I/C	FT 32 Federal Route 32 – Bandar Baru Nilai, Nilai, Pajam, Sepang, Sungai Pelek, Salak Tinggi, Banting, Universiti Sains Islam Malaysia (USIM)	Eight	110	DT	
Negeri Sembilan	Seremban		Old	Old Nilai I/C (closed in 2001)	FT 3265 Malaysia Federal Route 3265 – KLIA, Nilai, Pajam, Seremban	Eight	110		Closed
Negeri Sembilan	Seremban		I/C	NLE I/C	Nilai–Labu–Enstek Expressway – Nilai, Labu, Enstek	Eight	110		Proposed interchange
Negeri Sembilan	Seremban		BR	Lamiar River bridge		Eight	110		
Negeri Sembilan	Seremban	274.4	RSA	Seremban RSA	Seremban RSA – KFC Shell, Petronas	Eight	110		Southbound
Negeri Sembilan	Seremban	272.2	RSA	Seremban RSA	Seremban RSA – Burger King, Big Apple Donuts and Coffee Shell, Petronas	Eight	110		Northbound
Negeri Sembilan	Seremban		L/B	Petron L/B		Eight	110		Northbound
Negeri Sembilan	Seremban	269.7	217	Bandar Ainsdale I/C	FT 362 Jalan Labu – Bandar Ainsdale, Labu, Tiroi	Eight	110	T-B	
Negeri Sembilan	Seremban		BR	Railway crossing bridge		Eight	110		
Negeri Sembilan	Seremban	267.5	218	Seremban I/C	FT 241 Jalan Sungai Ujong – Seremban, Bukit Nenas, Labu	Eight	110	SD, PC	
Negeri Sembilan	Seremban		BR	Sungai Linggi bridge		Seven	110		3 lanes northbound, 4 lanes southbound
Negeri Sembilan	Seremban	260.0	219	Port Dickson I/C	FT 53 Jalan Rasah – Seremban, Rasah, Mambau, Lukut, Rantau, Port Dickson	Seven	110	PC-AB	3 lanes northbound, 4 lanes southbound
Negeri Sembilan	Seremban	256.1	220	Senawang I/C	FT 243 Senawang–NSE Road – Senawang, Seremban, Paroi, Kuala Pilah, Kajang, Semenyih, Jelebu	Six	110	T-A	
Negeri Sembilan	Seremban		BR	Sungai Simin bridge		Six	110		
Negeri Sembilan	Seremban	249.9	L/B	Senawang L/B	Senawang L/B –	Six	110		Southbound
Negeri Sembilan	Seremban	248.2	L/B	Senawang L/B	Senawang L/B –	Six	110		Northbound
Negeri Sembilan	Seremban		BR	Sungai Ibor bridge		Six	110		
Negeri Sembilan	Rembau	240.0	223	Pedas Linggi I/C	N9 Negeri Sembilan State Route N9 – Pedas, Linggi, Rembau	Six	110	T-A	
Negeri Sembilan	Rembau		BR	Sungai Pedas bridge		Six	110		
Negeri Sembilan	Rembau	237.0	V/P	Pedas Linggi V/P	Pedas Linggi V/P – V	Six	110		Southbound
Negeri Sembilan	Rembau		BR	Sungai Keling bridge		Six	110		
Negeri Sembilan	Rembau	230.3	L/B	Pedas Linggi L/B	Pedas Linggi L/B –	Six	110		Southbound
Negeri Sembilan	Rembau	227.5	BR	Sungai Rembau bridge		Six	110		
Negeri Sembilan	Rembau	225.5	L/B	Pedas Linggi L/B	Pedas Linggi L/B – Petronas	Six	110		Northbound
Negeri Sembilan	Rembau	224.0	V/P	Pedas Linggi V/P	Pedas Linggi V/P – V	Six	110		Northbound
Malacca	Alor Gajah		BR	Sungai Simpang Ampat bridge		Six	110		
Malacca	Alor Gajah	217.0	227	Simpang Ampat I/C (Alor Gajah I/C)	FT 19 AMJ Highway – Simpang Ampat, Alor Gajah, Tampin, Gemas, Batang Melaka, A Famosa Resort, Masjid Tanah, Tanjung Bidara	Six	110	T-B	
Malacca	Alor Gajah	209.9	OBR	Ayer Keroh OBR	Ayer Keroh OBR – KFC, A&W Caltex	Six	110		Both bounds
Malacca	Alor Gajah	209.9	RSA	Ayer Keroh RSA	Ayer Keroh RSA – Caltex, Petronas	Six	110		Southbound
Malacca	Alor Gajah	207.9	BR	Sungai Melaka bridge		Six	110		
Malacca	Alor Gajah	205.1	RSA	Ayer Keroh RSA	Ayer Keroh RSA – Petronas	Six	110		Northbound
Malacca	Alor Gajah		BR	Sungai Durian Tunggal bridge		Six	110		
Malacca	Alor Gajah	195.5	231	Ayer Keroh I/C	FT 143 Ayer Keroh Highway – Ayer Keroh, Hang Tuah Jaya, Malacca City, Durian Tunggal, Masjid Tanah, Universiti Teknikal Malaysia Melaka (UTeM), Malacca Zoo	Six	110	T-B	
Malacca	Jasin		BR	Sungai Ayer Panas bridge		Four	110		
Malacca	Jasin	185.3	L/B	Kampung Bemban L/B	Kampung Bemban L/B –	Four	110		Northbound
Malacca	Jasin	184.3	L/B	Kampung Bemban L/B	Kampung Bemban L/B –	Four	110		Southbound
Malacca	Jasin	183.6	BR	Sungai Ayer Merbau bridge		Four	110		
Malacca	Jasin	180.4	233	Jasin I/C	M25 Jalan Merlimau–Jasin – Lipat Kajang, Merlimau, Jasin, Bandar Jasin Bestari, Sungai Rambai, Bamban, Nyalas, Asahan	Four	110	T-B	
Malacca	Jasin		BR	Sungai Chin Chin bridge		Four	110		
Malacca–Johor border		174.0	BR	Sungai Kesang bridge		Four	110		
Johor	Tangkak		BR	Sungai Tangkak bridge		Four	110		
Johor	Tangkak	169.6	235	Tangkak I/C	FT 23 Jalan Segamat–Muar – Tangkak, Bandar Maharani Bandar Diraja (Muar) (Royal Town), Segamat, Jementah, Sagil, Mount Ledang National Park, Gemas, Kuantan, Bandar Muadzam Shah	Four	110	T-A	
Johor	Tangkak	165.0	L/B	Tangkak L/B	Tangkak L/B – Shell	Four	110		Southbound
Johor	Tangkak	161.6	L/B	Tangkak L/B	Tangkak L/B –	Four	110		Northbound
Johor	Tangkak		BR	Sungai Belemang Besar bridge		Four	110		
Johor	Tangkak	156.7	236	Bukit Gambir I/C	J33 Johor State Route J33 – Bukit Gambir, Serom, Panchor, Sungai Mati, Bandar Maharani Bandar Diraja (Muar) (Royal Town)	Four	110	T-A	
Johor	Tangkak–Muar district border		BR	Sungai Muar bridge		Four	110		
Johor	Muar	146.6	RSA	Pagoh RSA	Pagoh RSA – Summer, Shell, BHPetrol	Four	110		Northbound
Johor	Muar		BR	Parit Lundang Gajah bridge		Four	110		
Johor	Muar	141.8	238	Pagoh I/C	J32 Johor State Route J32 – Pagoh, Panchor, Bukit Kepong, Bandar Maharani Bandar Diraja (Muar) (Royal Town), Sungai Abong, Bukit Bakri, Labis, Chaah, Segamat, Segamat Inland Port, Bandar Universiti Pagoh, TAR UMT	Four	110	T-A	
Johor	Muar		BR	Sungai Pagoh bridge		Four	110		
Johor	Muar	135.5	RSA	Pagoh RSA	Pagoh RSA – Petron, BHPetrol	Four	110		Southbound
Johor	Muar		BR	Sungai Pendendam bridge		Four	110		
Johor	Muar		BR	Sungai Pagoh bridge		Four	110		
Johor	Batu Pahat	123.0	BR	Sungai Ayer Puteh bridge		Four	110		
Johor	Batu Pahat	122.0	I/C	Parit Sulong I/C	J128 Johor State Route J128 – Kangkar Senangar, Parit Sulong, Bukit Naning, Batu Pahat	Four	110		Proposed
Johor	Batu Pahat		BR	Sungai Pancho bridge		Four	110		
Johor	Batu Pahat		BR	Sungai Simpang Kiri bridge		Four	110		
Johor	Batu Pahat	108.8	L/B	Yong Peng L/B	Yong Peng L/B –	Four	110		Northbound
Johor	Batu Pahat	105.3	L/B	Yong Peng L/B	Yong Peng L/B –	Four	110		Southbound
Johor	Batu Pahat	99.9	241	Yong Peng North I/C	FT 24 Jalan Muar–Yong Peng – Yong Peng, Chaah, Bekok, Labis, Segamat, Parit Yaani, Parit Sulong, Batu Pahat	Four	110	T-A	
Johor	Batu Pahat		BR	Sungai Bekok bridge		Four	110		
Johor	Batu Pahat		BR	Sungai Sedi bridge		Four	110		
Johor	Batu Pahat	94.5	242	Yong Peng South I/C	FT 1 / AH142 Jalan Segamat–Yong Peng – Yong Peng, Chaah, Bekok, Labis, Segamat, Batu Pahat	Four	110	P-Y	Access from / to south only
Johor	Batu Pahat		BR	Sungai Sembrong bridge		Four	110		
Johor	Batu Pahat	80.0	244	Ayer Hitam I/C	FT 50 Malaysia Federal Route 50 – Ayer Hitam, Parit Raja, Sri Gading, Batu Pahat, Kluang, Kahang, Mersing, Kuala Rompin, Pekan, Kuantan, Pulau Tioman, Tun Hussein Onn University of Malaysia (UTHM)	Four	110	T-B	
Johor	Kluang	74.7	RSA	Machap RSA	Machap RSA – Petronas, Shell	Four	110		Northbound
Johor	Kluang	74.6	RSA	Machap RSA	Machap RSA – Petronas, Shell	Four	110		Southbound
Johor	Kluang	73.0	245	Machap I/C	FT 1 Federal Route 1 – Machap, Simpang Renggam, Ayer Hitam, Tropical Village	Four	110	T-B	
Johor	Kluang		BR	Sungai Machap bridge		Four	110		
Johor	Kluang		BR	Sungai Benut bridge		Four	110		
Johor	Kluang	58.6	247	Simpang Renggam I/C	FT 96 Jalan Simpang Renggam–Benut – Simpang Renggam, Rengit, Benut, Rambah, Teluk Kerang, Penerok, Ayer Baloi, Pontian, Kukup, Tanjung Piai	Four	110	T-B	
Johor	Kluang	54.3	L/B	Simpang Renggam L/B	Simpang Renggam L/B – Petron	Four	110		Southbound
Johor	Kluang	54.2	L/B	Simpang Renggam L/B	Simpang Renggam L/B – Baskin Robbins	Four	110		Northbound
Johor	Kulai	40.9	250	Sedenak I/C	J107 Johor State Route J107 – Sedenak, Kelapa Sawit, Layang-Layang, Felda Bukit Batu	Four	110	T-B	
Johor	Kulai		BR	Sungai Ulu Pontian bridge		Four	110		
Johor	Kulai		BR	Sungai Pontian bridge		Four	110		
Johor	Kulai	33.2	L/B	Kulai L/B	Kulai L/B –	Four	110		Southbound
Johor	Kulai	33.1	L/B	Kulai L/B	Kulai L/B – Shell	Four	110		Northbound
Johor	Kulai	27.5	252	Kulai I/C	J165 Johor State Route J165 – Kulai, Bandar Indahpura, Senai, Kota Tinggi, Gunung Pulai, Kota Tinggi Waterfall, Desaru	Four	110	T-B	
Johor	Kulai	18.0	253	Senai North I/C	Second Link Expressway / AH143 – Senai, Senai International Airport, Bandar Indahpura, Desaru, Ulu Tiram, Kota Tinggi, Pasir Gudang, Bandar Penawar, Gelang Patah, Tanjung Kupang, Bukit Indah, Iskandar Puteri (Nusajaya), Tanjung Pelepas, Tuas (Singapore), Port of Tanjung Pelepas Johor Premium Outlets, Legoland, Kota Iskandar, Puteri Harbour, Pontian, Johor Bahru	Four	110	T-B	
Johor	Kulai	17.3	RSA	Skudai RSA	Skudai RSA – Starbucks, FamilyMart Petron, Shell, BHPetrol, Caltex	Four	110		Southbound
Johor	Kulai	15.0	T/P	Skudai Toll Plaza	Touch 'n Go Touch 'n Go SmartTAG SmartTAG MyRFID MyRFID SmartTAG SmartTAG Touch 'n Go Touch 'n Go	Four	60		
Johor	Kulai	14.3	L/B	Petronas and Petron L/B		Four	110		Northbound
Johor	Kulai	13.1	254	Skudai I/C	FT 1 Skudai Highway – Senai, Senai International Airport, Skudai, Pulai, Taman Unversiti, Johor Bahru, Woodlands (Singapore), Pontian, University of Technology Malaysia (UTM)	Four	110	C	
Johor	Kulai		BR	Sungai Skudai bridge		Four	110		
Johor	Johor Bahru		BR	Railway crossing bridge		Four	110		
Johor	Johor Bahru	11.0	254A	Bukit Amber I/C	Jalan Bukit Impian – Seelong, Senai Airport City , Bukit Amber, Taman Impian Emas,	Four	110	D-R	Opened 2016
Johor	Johor Bahru		L/B	Kempas L/B	Kempas L/B –	Four	60		
Johor	Johor Bahru		T/P	Kempas Toll Plaza	Touch 'n Go Touch 'n Go SmartTAG MyRFID MyRFID SmartTAG Touch 'n Go Touch 'n Go	Four	60		
Johor	Johor Bahru	6.5	255	Kempas I/C	J105 Johor State Route J105 – Senai, Skudai, Setia Tropika, Kempas, Tampoi, Larkin, Johor Bahru	Four	110	C	
Johor	Johor Bahru	5.5	255B	Setia Tropika I/C	Jalan Setia Tropika – Setia Tropika	Four	110	LILO	Northbound direction only
Johor	Johor Bahru	5.5	255A	Desa Palma I/C	Persiaran Desa Palma – Desa Palma, Nasa City, Taman Bukit Mutiara	Four	110	LILO	Southbound direction only
Johor	Johor Bahru	3.5	255C	Bandar Dato' Onn I/C	Persiaran Dato' Onn – Bandar Dato' Onn, Adda Heights, Seri Austin, Taman Daya	Four	110		
Johor	Johor Bahru		BR	Railway crossing bridge		Four	110		
Johor	Johor Bahru	0.7	256	Pasir Gudang I/C	FT 17 Pasir Gudang Highway – Bandar Sri Alam, Mount Austin, Taman Gaya, Desa Tebrau, Permas Jaya, Masai, Pasir Gudang, Ulu Tiram, Kota Tinggi, Mersing, Johor Port	Four	110	D-R	Access from / to Pasir Gudang only
Johor	Johor Bahru		BR	Sungai Bala bridge		Four	110		
Johor	Johor Bahru	0.0	257 1404	Pandan I/C	FT 3 / AH18 Tebrau Highway – Johor Bahru, Kuantan, Pekan, Kuala Rompin, Mersing, Kota Tinggi, Ulu Tiram	Four	110	C	Southern terminus of concurrency with AH2
Through to Johor Bahru Eastern Dispersal Link Expressway / AH2
1.000 km = 0.621 mi; 1.000 mi = 1.609 km: Concurrency terminus; Incomplete access; Unopened
