= Malaysia Federal Route 13 =

Road in Malaysia

Federal Route 13

Route information
- Maintained by Malaysian Public Works Department
- Length: 13.69 km (8.51 mi)

Major junctions
- West end: Juasseh
- FT 9 Federal Route 9 FT 246 Federal Route 246; N17 Jalan Dangi; FT 10 Federal Route 10
- East end: Bahau

Location
- Country: Malaysia
- Primary destinations: Serting, Kuala Pilah, Johol, Batu Kikir, Rompin

Highway system
- Highways in Malaysia; Expressways; Federal; State

Federal Route 13 is a federal road in Negeri Sembilan, Malaysia. The 13.6 kilometres (8 mi) connects Juasseh in the west to Bahau in the east.

The Kilometre Zero is located at Bahau.

At most sections, the Federal Route 13 was built under the JKR R5 road standard, allowing maximum speed limit of up to 90 km/h.

== Junction lists ==
The entire route is located in Negeri Sembilan.

Legend:

- I/C - Interchange, I/S - Intersection, RSA - Rest and service area, OBR - Overhead bridge restaurant, R/R - Restaurant and rest plaza, L/B - Layby, V/P - Vista point, TN - tunnel, T/P - Toll plaza, BR - Bridge
- C - Cloverleaf, S - Stack, T-A - Trumpet-A, T-B - Trumpet-B, DT - Directional-T/Y, SDT - Semi-Directional-T/Y, P-Y - Partial-Y, D - Diamond, P-C - Partial cloverleaf, D-D - Diverging diamond, D-R - Direct ramp

District	Location	km	mi	Name	Destinations	Notes
Kuala Pilah	Juasseh	13.69	8.51	Juasseh	FT 9 Malaysia Federal Route 9 – Karak, Kuala Klawang, Serting, Kuala Pilah, Johol, Tampin	T-junctions
Kuala Pilah	Juasseh			Kampung Juaseh	N127 Negeri Sembilan State Route N127	T-junctions
Kuala Pilah	Juasseh			Kampung Terusan		
Jempol	Bahau			Kampung Padang Lalang		
Jempol	Bahau			Kampung Kuala Kepis	Kampung Kuala Kepis	T-junctions
Jempol	Bahau			Sungai Jempol bridge		
Jempol	Bahau			Kampung Jambu Lapan	FT 246 Malaysia Federal Route 246 – Batu Kikir, Serting; N17 Jalan Dangi – Dangi, Johol	Junctions
Jempol	Bahau			Bahau; Bahau railway station	KTM Intercity	
Jempol	Bahau	0.0	0.0	Bahau	FT 10 Malaysia Federal Route 10 – Temerloh, Teriang, Bandar Seri Jempol, Bandar Tun Abdul Razak, Bandar Muadzam Shah, Bera Lake, Rompin, Gemas, Segamat	T-junctions
1.000 mi = 1.609 km; 1.000 km = 0.621 mi
