= Malaysia Federal Route 9 =

Road in Malaysia

Federal Route 9
- Karak–Tampin Highway; Jalan Karak–Tampin

Route information
- Maintained by Malaysian Public Works Department
- Length: 138.19 km (85.87 mi)

Major junctions
- North end: Karak, Pahang
- FT 2 Federal Route 2 FT 86 Federal Route 86; FT 245 Federal Route 245; FT 11 Federal Route 11; FT 246 Federal Route 246; FT 13 Federal Route 13; FT 51 Federal Route 51; FT 1 Federal Route 1
- South end: Tampin, Negeri Sembilan

Location
- Country: Malaysia
- Primary destinations: Mancis, Simpang Durian, Serting, Juasseh, Kuala Pilah, Johol

Highway system
- Highways in Malaysia; Expressways; Federal; State

Federal Route 9 or Karak–Tampin Highway (Malay: Jalan Karak–Tampin) is a federal road in Pahang and Negeri Sembilan, Malaysia. It connects Karak, Pahang in the north with Tampin, Negeri Sembilan in the south, running along the eastern edge of the Titiwangsa Mountains.

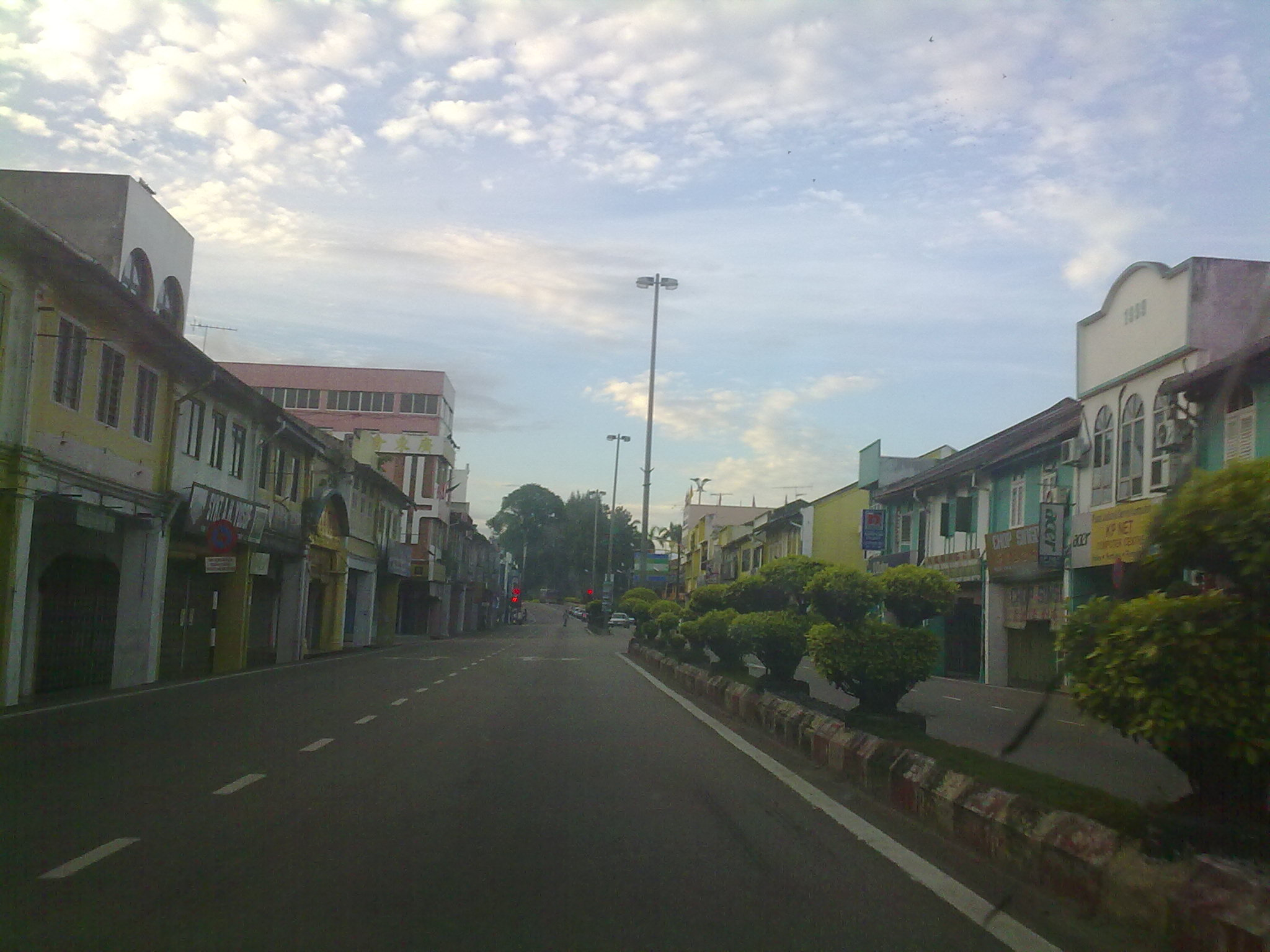
FT9 runs through downtown Kuala Pilah as the town's main thoroughfare, southbound towards Tampin.

== Features ==
At most sections, the Federal Route 9 was built under the JKR R5 road standard, with a speed limit of 90 km/h.

== Junction lists ==
State	District	Location	km	mi	Name	Destinations	Notes
Pahang	Bentong	Karak			Karak	FT 2 Malaysia Federal Route 2 – Kuala Lumpur, Bentong, Raub, Kuala Lipis, Mentakab, Temerloh, Maran, Kuantan Kuala Lumpur–Karak Expressway / AH141 – Kuala Lumpur, Ipoh, Genting Highlands East Coast Expressway / AH141 – Kuantan, Kuala Terengganu	T-junctions
Pahang	Bentong	Karak			Kampung Seri Telemong		
Pahang	Bentong	Karak			Kampung Sungai Perdak		
Pahang	Bentong	Karak			Ladang Renjok		
Pahang	Bentong	Karak			Kampung Telemong		
Pahang	Bentong	Karak			Ladang Tuan		
Pahang	Bentong	Karak			Kampung Sungai Gapoi		
Pahang	Bentong	Karak			Kampung Batu 36		
Pahang	Bentong	Karak			Jalan Kemansul	C120 Jalan Kemansul – FELDA Kemansul	T-junctions
Pahang	Bentong	Karak			Kampung Ponsoon		
Pahang	Bentong	Karak			Kampung Safie		
Pahang	Bentong	Karak			Mancis		
Pahang	Bentong	Karak			Kampung Tengah		
Pahang	Bentong	Karak			Simpang Pelangai	C109 Jalan Bukit Gajah – Kampung Bukit Gajah, FELDA Bukit Mendi, Triang, Kemayan	T-junctions
Negeri Sembilan	Jelebu	Simpang Durian			Kampung Rangoi		
Negeri Sembilan	Jelebu	Simpang Durian			Kampung Durian Tipus		
Negeri Sembilan	Jelebu	Simpang Durian			Simpang Durian		
Negeri Sembilan	Jelebu	Simpang Durian			Kampung Ayer Baning		
Negeri Sembilan	Jelebu	Simpang Pertang			Jalan Kerangai	N23 Jalan Kerangai – Kampung Kerangai, Kuala Klawang, Seremban	T-junctions
Negeri Sembilan	Jelebu	Simpang Pertang			Kampung Putra		
Negeri Sembilan	Jelebu	Simpang Pertang			Simpang Pertang	FT 86 Malaysia Federal Route 86 – Kuala Klawang, Seremban	T-junctions
Negeri Sembilan	Jempol	Serting			Serting Ulu	FT 245 Malaysia Federal Route 245 – Ayer Hitam, Bera, Temerloh	T-junctions
Negeri Sembilan	Jempol	Serting			Kampung Bahru Serting Tengah		
Negeri Sembilan	Jempol	Serting			Serting	FT 11 Malaysia Federal Route 11 – Bandar Seri Jempol, Bandar Tun Abdul Razak, Bandar Muadzam Shah, Pekan, Kuantan, Bera Lake	T-junctions
Negeri Sembilan	Jempol	Batu Kikir			Batu Kikir	FT 246 Malaysia Federal Route 246 – Kampung Jambu Lapan, Bahau; N19 Jalan Pertang-Batu Kikir – Simpang Pertang, Kuala Klawang	T-junctions
Negeri Sembilan	Kuala Pilah	Juasseh			Juasseh	FT 13 Malaysia Federal Route 13 – Bahau, Rompin, Gemas	T-junctions
Negeri Sembilan	Kuala Pilah	Juasseh			Pelangai		
Negeri Sembilan	Kuala Pilah	Kuala Pilah			Kuala Pilah	FT 51 Malaysia Federal Route 51 – Seremban, Kuala Lumpur, Tanjung Ipoh, Seri Menanti	Junctions
Negeri Sembilan	Kuala Pilah	Kuala Pilah			Kampung Tebat Kening		
Negeri Sembilan	Kuala Pilah	Kuala Pilah			Kampung Batu Temensu		
Negeri Sembilan	Kuala Pilah	Kuala Pilah			Kampung Tanah Merah		
Negeri Sembilan	Kuala Pilah	Kuala Pilah			Sungai Pilah bridge		
Negeri Sembilan	Kuala Pilah	Kuala Pilah			Senaling	N24 Negeri Sembilan State Route N24 – Tanjung Ipoh, Seri Menanti	T-junctions
Negeri Sembilan	Kuala Pilah	Kuala Pilah			Senaling		
Negeri Sembilan	Kuala Pilah	Kuala Pilah			Kampung Sungai Layang		
Negeri Sembilan	Kuala Pilah	Johol			Selaru		
Negeri Sembilan	Kuala Pilah	Johol			Kampung Hulu Selaru		
Negeri Sembilan	Kuala Pilah	Johol			Kampung Baharu Simpang Dangi		
Negeri Sembilan	Kuala Pilah	Johol			Johol	N14 Jalan Inas – Inas, Rembau	T-junctions
Negeri Sembilan	Kuala Pilah	Johol			Kampung Kuala Nuri		
Negeri Sembilan	Kuala Pilah	Johol			Ayer Mawang		
Negeri Sembilan	Tampin	Tampin			Kampung Chenaga		
Negeri Sembilan	Tampin	Tampin			Tampin	FT 1 Malaysia Federal Route 1 – Seremban, Rembau, Gemencheh, Gemas, Segamat, Alor Gajah, Malacca; North–South Expressway Southern Route / AH2 – Kuala Lumpur, Seremban, Johor Bahru, Singapore	Junctions
1.000 mi = 1.609 km; 1.000 km = 0.621 mi
