= SBP Integrasi Jempol =

Sekolah Berasrama Penuh Integrasi Jempol
- INTEJ

Location
- 72200 Batu Kikir; Batu Kikir, Negeri Sembilan; Malaysia

Information
- Type: Public boarding school
- Motto: Ilmu Memantapkan Iman
- Religious affiliation: Islam
- Established: 7 January 2002
- Principal: Norazhar Bin Mohamad Shah
- Grades: Form 1 - Form 5
- Yearbook: Al-Qalam

Sekolah Berasrama Penuh Integrasi Jempol (English: Jempol Integrated Fully Residential School; abbreviated INTEJ) is a boarding school located in Jempol, Negeri Sembilan. Bahau is the nearest town with a distance of about 19.3 kilometers (12 miles). SBPI Jempol features six blocks.

== History ==
The school was opened on 7 January 2002. Initially, the school was known as Sekolah Menengah Kebangsaan Agama Jempol (SMKAJ) before it was changed to Sekolah Menengah Agama Persekutuan Jempol (SMAPJ). The school has been upgraded as Sekolah Berasrama Penuh Integrasi Jempol on 3 December 2002.

The school was initially staying at the Sekolah Menengah Kebangsaan Batu Kikir (SMKBK) for almost seven months pending the completion of the school building. School sessions conducted in the afternoon. Before the arrival of Mrs. Head, Mrs. Rubiyah Aaron on 16 March 2002, the principal task of the teacher were being temporary hold by Senior Administrative Assistant, Mrs Hajjah Zabidah binti Haji Lasim. At that time, there were only about 16 students and one school staff. The number of Form One and Form Four students who had signed up were 150 and 29 respectively.

On 8 July 2002, INTEJ moved to their official buildings located 0.5 miles (0.80 km) from SMKBK with an area of 48 acres (190,000 m^{2}) with modern and futuristic facilities to allow the students to learn with ease in a conducive atmosphere. In 2003, starting from 8 January until July, a total of 188 students of Form One and Form Four registered there. By the end of October, there were about 367 students, 54 academic staffs and 12 school staffs. In 2003, two schools offered to form four students of Religious Science and Pure Science.
