= Malaysia Federal Route 246 =

Road in Malaysia

Federal Route 246

Route information
- Maintained by Malaysian Public Works Department
- Length: 8.2 km (5.1 mi)

Major junctions
- Northwest end: Batu Kikir
- FT 9 Federal Route 9 FT 13 Federal Route 13
- Southeast end: Bahau; Kampung Jambu Lapan

Location
- Country: Malaysia
- Primary destinations: Serting Hilir, Batu Kikir, Bahau

Highway system
- Highways in Malaysia; Expressways; Federal; State

Federal Route 246 (formerly Negeri Sembilan State Route N17 (Batu Kikir - Kampung Jambu Lapan side)) is a federal road in Negeri Sembilan, Malaysia. The Kilometre Zero of the Federal Route 246 is at Batu Kikir. This road is an inland road that connects to Bahau from Batu Kikir. The more popular option is Route 13 near Juasseh.

== Features ==
At most sections, the Federal Route 246 was built under the JKR U5 road standard, allowing maximum speed limit of up to 50 km/h.

== Junction lists ==
The entire route is located in Jempol District, Negeri Sembilan.

Legend:

- I/C - Interchange, I/S - Intersection, RSA - Rest and service area, OBR - Overhead bridge restaurant, R/R - Restaurant and rest plaza, L/B - Layby, V/P - Vista point, TN - tunnel, T/P - Toll plaza, BR - Bridge
- C - Cloverleaf, S - Stack, T-A - Trumpet-A, T-B - Trumpet-B, DT - Directional-T/Y, SDT - Semi-Directional-T/Y, P-Y - Partial-Y, D - Diamond, P-C - Partial cloverleaf, D-D - Diverging diamond, D-R - Direct ramp

Location	km	Name	Destinations	Notes
Batu Kikir	0.0	Batu Kikir	FT 9 Malaysia Federal Route 9 – Karak, Kuala Klawang, Serting, Kuala Pilah, Johol, Tampin	T-junctions
Batu Kikir		Kampung Tehat		
Batu Kikir		Kampung Tengah		
Batu Kikir		Jalan Lonek	Jalan Lonek – Lonek	T-junctions
Batu Kikir		Serting Hilir		
Bahau		Kampung Batu Kelulut		
Bahau		Kampung Kuala Sialang		
Bahau		Kampung Bukit Laka		
Bahau		Kampung Tunku Puan Chik		
Bahau		Bahau; Kampung Jambu Lapan	FT 13 Malaysia Federal Route 13 – Juasseh, Kuala Pilah, Seremban, Tampin, Bahau Town Centre, Temerloh, Jempol, Gemas; N17 Jalan Dangi – Dangi, Johol	Junctions
1.000 mi = 1.609 km; 1.000 km = 0.621 mi
