= Bahau =

Town in Negeri Sembilan, Malaysia

- Town
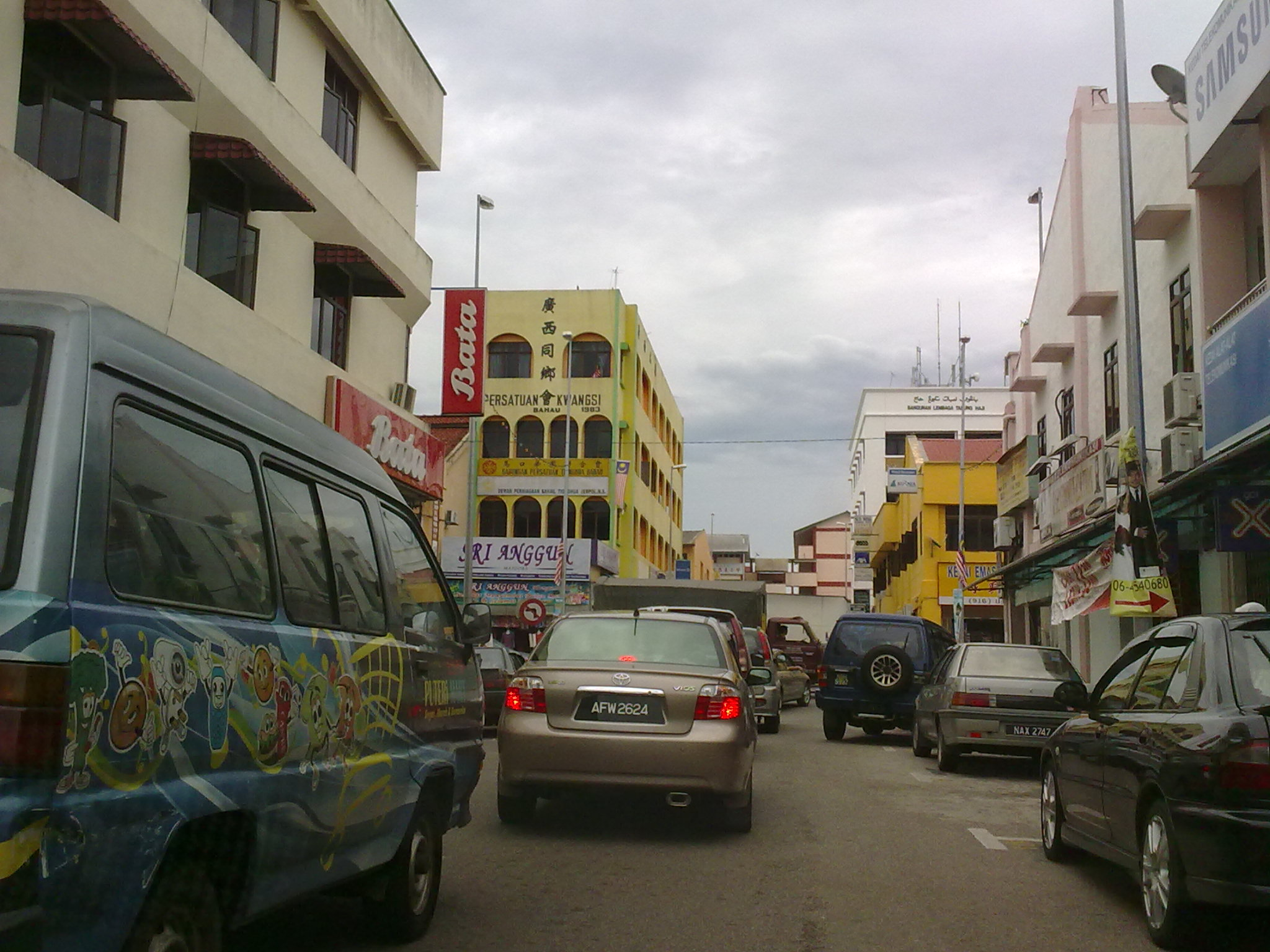
- Downtown Bahau
- Interactive map of Bahau
- Bahau in Negeri Sembilan Bahau (Malaysia) Bahau (Southeast Asia)
- Coordinates: 2°48′35″N 102°23′59″E
- Country: Malaysia
- State: Negeri Sembilan
- District: Jempol
- Luak: Jempol

Government
  - Body: Jempol Municipal Council
  - President: Mohd Nazri Mulup
  - MP: Shamshulkahar Mohd Deli (BN–UMNO)
  - MLA: Teo Kok Seong (PH–DAP)
- Time zone: UTC+8 (MYT)
- Postal code: 72100

Bahau is the principal town of Jempol District, Negeri Sembilan, Malaysia.

== Etymology ==
The town's name is believed to have been derived from a Chinese phrase. Bahau's literal translation is "horse's mouth" while the nearby town, Mahsan means "horse's body" in Cantonese. Also, there's a linkage town called Tampin near the border with Malacca, locals nickname as Mahmei, means "horse's tail" in Cantonese.

== History ==
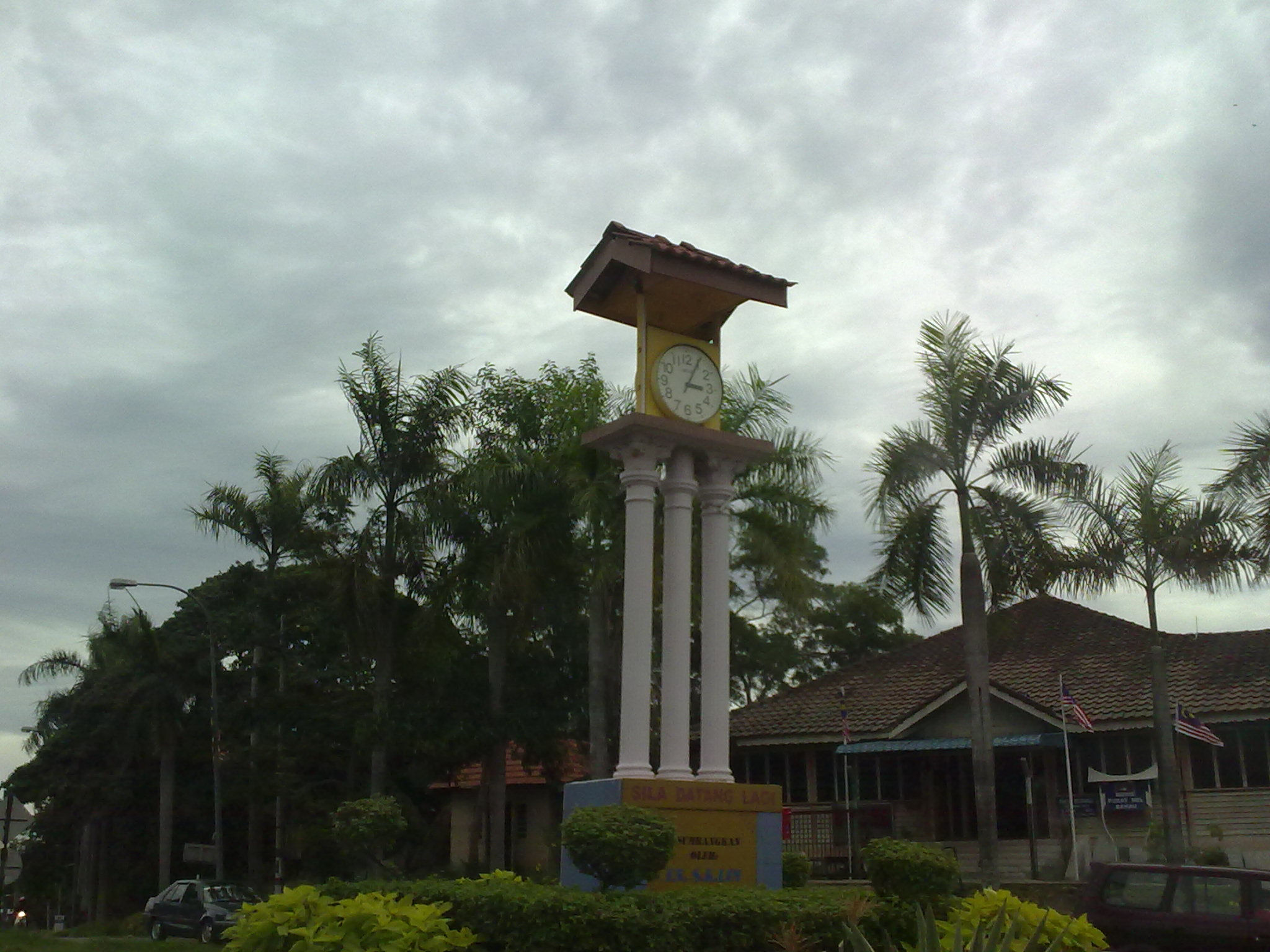
Bahau Small Clock Tower

The earliest recorded role of the area around Bahau is as a town along the "Denai Penarikan", a water-land route through the interior of Peninsular Malaysia, linking Muar, Johor in the west coast, to Pekan, Pahang in the east coast. The "Denai Penarikan" or the "Pulling Portage" is a land route where merchants would pull their boats across the land from Sungai Muar which flows westwards to Sungai Serting which flows eastwards.

The town did not flourish until the arrival of Chinese settlers moving inland in search of tin ore. The Chinese settlers established the town of Bahau and nearby Mahsan, and the town grew as the rubber, palm oil and timber trade (fading industry) began to dominate the town's economy.

During the Second World War, preparations were made to evacuate people from Singapore to Johor and Negeri Sembilan. Singapore was then overcrowded and the food situation critical. Eurasian emigrants were brought to Bahau after the success in bringing the Chinese to Endau. However, malaria proved to a constant scourge, and the emigrants discovered that the area had not been adequately prepared for their arrival. The Syonan-to government could not extend to Bahau the same assistance given to Endau because the former became the Negeri Sembilan authorities' responsibility. The residents here also enjoyed less freedom than their counterparts in Endau.

Three hundred Eurasian families and 400 Chinese catholic families left Syonan for Bahau. Many could not adjust to the hard life as pioneers in an agricultural colony. Catholic nuns and the orphans in their care were reduced to eating a stew made from snail and grass. A high death rate claimed many, including the leader of the project, Bishop Devals.

The project at Bahau came to an end when the Allied Southeast Asia Command dropped supplies of food and medicine. Bahau was classified as a "displaced person's camp", and the majority of its inmates were temporarily transferred to Sime Road Camp in Singapore by the British.

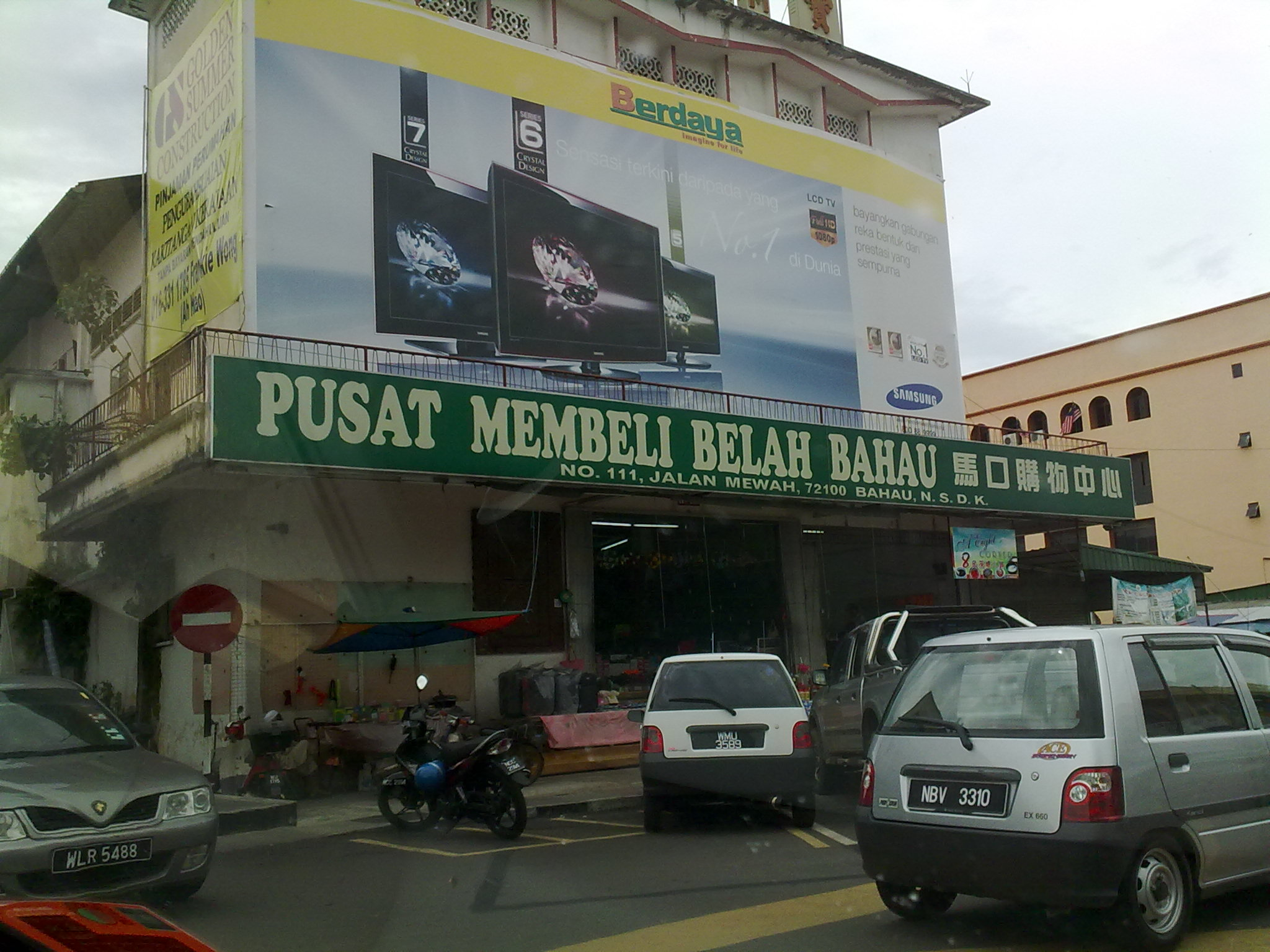
Pusat Membeli Belah Bahau used to be a cinema

== Demographics ==
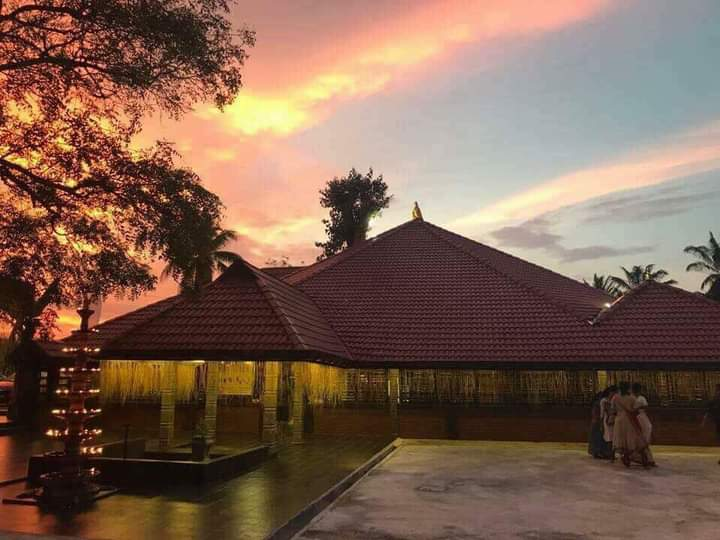
Sri Mangala Chamundi Temple, a famous Hindu temple in bahau with Kerala archistructure

As of 2020, the population of Bahau stands at 32,018. Bahau comprises mainly Chinese, Malays (from the Felda areas in the outskirts of the town) and Indians, who live in town and the estates on the outskirts.

The following is based on Department of Statistics Malaysia 2020 census.

Ethnic groups in Bahau, 2020
Ethnicity	Population	Percentage
Chinese	14,454	45.14%
Bumiputera	12,647	39.50%
Indian	4,502	14.06%
Others	95	0.30%
Non-Malaysian	320	1.00%

Ethnic breakdown of Bahau as of 2020
1. Chinese (45.6%)
2. Malay (39.9%)
3. Indian (14.2%)
4. Other ethnicities (0.30%)

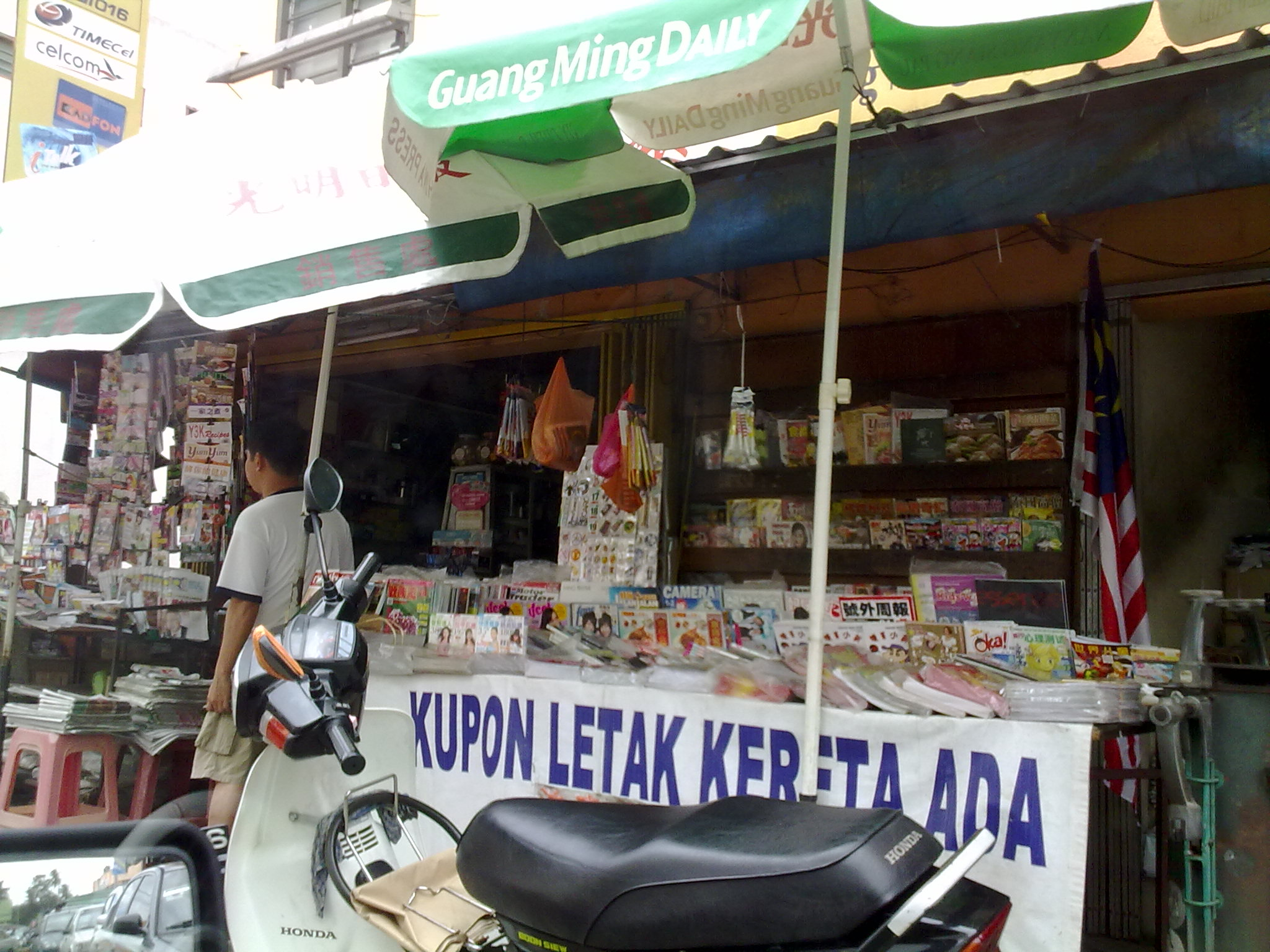
Magazines shop in Bahau

== Transportation ==
=== Road ===
Two main federal routes - FT 10 and FT 13 intersect in Bahau. FT 10 links Bahau to Bandar Seri Jempol, the district capital, and Temerloh, Pahang in the north and Gemas in the south. Route [Federal Route 13 links Bahau to Juasseh and Batu Kikir, near Kuala Pilah. There is also the Route 246 Federal Route 246 which gives a more direct route to Batu Kikir via small inland villages.

=== Train ===
Bahau is accessible by train, being one of the major stations on the East Coast Jungle Railway, which stretches from Gemas in the south to Tumpat in the north. The railway station is located near Taman Kwang Hup. Bahau is the only town in Negeri Sembilan that is only served by the East Coast main line instead of the West Coast main line. There used to be a branch from Bahau to Kuala Pilah but closed in the 1930s during the Great Depression.

== Town Areas ==
Mahsan, Jelai and Rompin, in the town's outskirts, are a comfortable short distance drive from Bahau.

=== Modern Housing Areas ===
1. Taman Bahau
2. Taman Rasa Sayang
3. Taman Cempaka
4. Taman Angkasa
5. Taman Khaya
6. Taman Kwang Hup 2
7. Taman Margosa
8. Taman ACBE
9. Taman Seri Jempol
10. Taman Satelite 2
11. Taman Serting Jaya
12. Taman Kepayang
13. Taman Putra
14. Taman Meranti
15. Taman Bidara
16. Rumah Rakyat Jambu Lapan
17. Taman Desa Puteri
18. Taman Kasih Putra
19. Taman Satelite
20. Taman Desa Penarikan
21. Taman Sornam
22. Taman Tunku Puan Chik
23. Bandar IOI Bahau
24. Taman Juara

=== Villages ===
1. Kampung Pak Ka Choon
2. Kampung Batu Bakar
3. Kampung Cina, Bahau
4. Kampung Indah
5. Kampung Bukit Laka
6. Kampung Kuala Jempol
7. Kampung Padang Lalang
8. Kampung Bukit Kelulut
9. Kampung Lonek
10. Kampung Baru Airhitam

=== Nearby Towns ===
1. Mahsan
2. Juasseh
3. Rompin
4. Dangi
5. Batu Kikir

== Economy ==
The major source of income of the town of Bahau was the timber industry which has contributed to the town's growth in the past few decades. The cultivation of palm oil and rubber also significantly impacted the town's economy and today, prominent estates in the town developed by IOI group, Sime Darby (Golden Hope), KLK and smallholder is speeding up.

Besides, industries in the town are also currently growing. Bahau's industrial area is located near Taman Kwang Hup. Car workshops, mechanics, spare parts and accessories shops dominate the business in town because of the flourishing timber trade around the area. Hence, trailers and lorries usually frequent the town for repairs.

== Education ==
There are 7 schools in the vicinity of Bahau, namely.

1. SJK(C) Bahau

2. SJK(C) Chi Wen

3. SK St. Aidan

4. SJK(T) St. Helier

5. SMK Datuk Mansor

6. SMK Bahau

7. SMJK Chi Wen Bahau

== Commerce ==
The town centre is the commercial centre of the district since shops were built there in pre-war. The town centre is known to locals as the 'Main Road' or 'Jalan Besar'. The shops there are mostly run by Chinese traders and suppliers. The shophouses still bear the architecture from the colonial era, when Bahau was a Chinese settlement. Today, more commercial areas are being built outside town as the town grows. Locals and visitors alike frequent the many restaurants and coffee shops in town. However, due to the increasing rent rates in the town centre, some old coffee shops have been closed down, and some of these shops have moved to other places around and in the outskirts of the town.

== Food ==
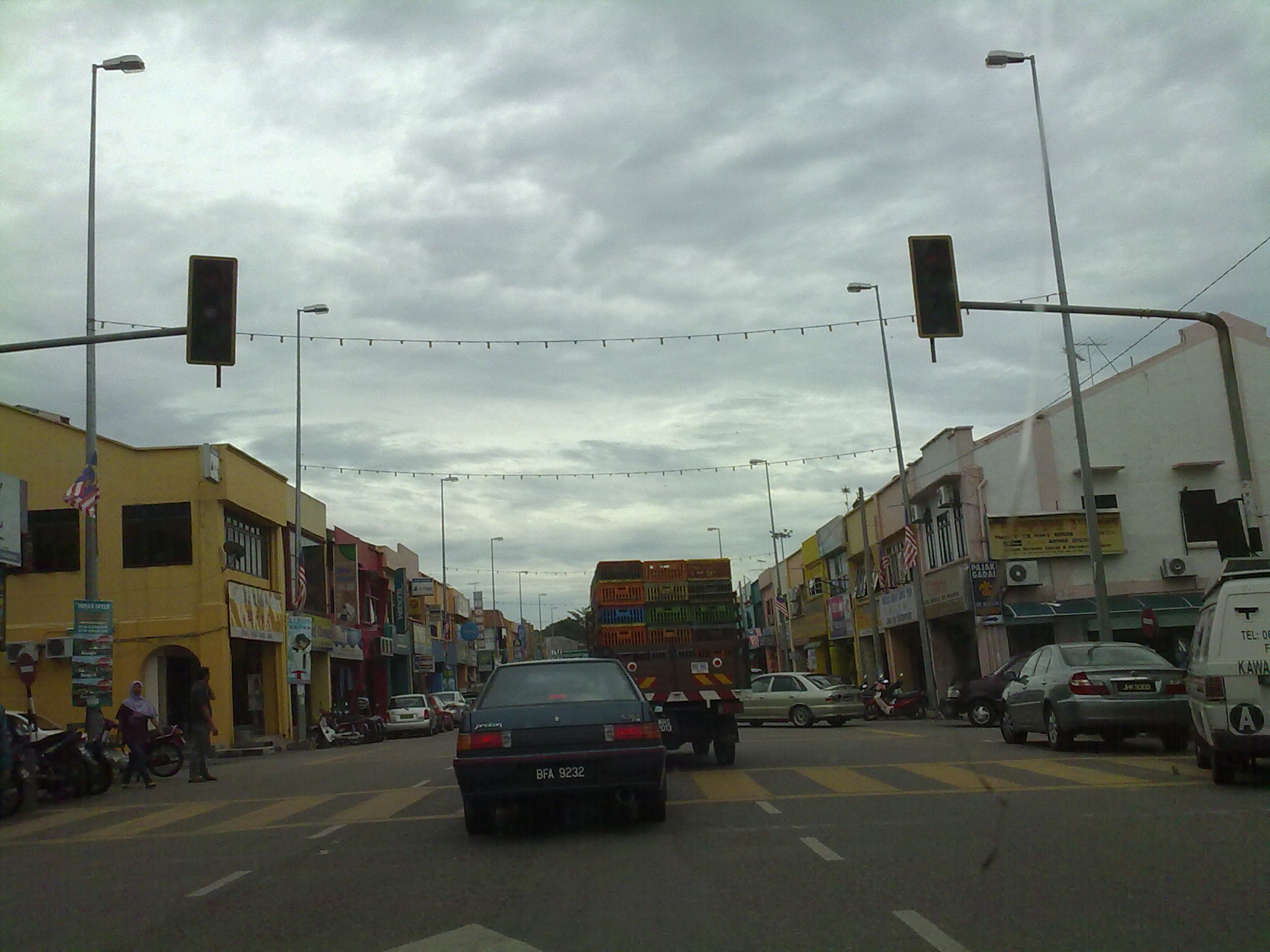
Bahau main thoroughfare

Among the notable foods in town are the chicken and mutton soup that is cooked with traditional herbs. There is also cendol, a dessert made from shaved ice and its namesake strings of green, stringy jelly, dressed in rich coconut milk (Malay: santan) and gula melaka molasses. The nearby town of Mahsan offers exotic food like wild boar, squirrels, lizards and bats. Malay hawkers will offer visitors the famous Negeri Sembilanese dish of masak lemak lada api, which is basically a hot and spicy curry made with coconut milk and various meats and vegetables, spiced with turmeric (Malay: kunyit) and hefty amounts of bird's eye chilli (Malay: cili api/cili padi/lada api).
