= Malaysia Federal Route 245 =

Road in Malaysia

Federal Route 245

Route information
- Maintained by Malaysian Public Works Department
- Length: 10.1 km (6.3 mi)

Major junctions
- Southwest end: Serting Ulu
- FT 9 Federal Route 9 FT 10 Federal Route 10
- Northeast end: Ayer Hitam

Location
- Country: Malaysia
- Primary destinations: Pasoh 2 & 3

Highway system
- Highways in Malaysia; Expressways; Federal; State

Federal Route 245 (formerly Negeri Sembilan State Route N21) is a federal road in Negeri Sembilan, Malaysia. The Kilometre Zero of the Federal Route 245 is at Serting Ulu.

== Features ==
At most sections, the Federal Route 245 was built under the JKR U5 road standard, with a speed limit of 50 km/h (31 mph).

== Junction lists ==
The entire route is located in Jempol District, Negeri Sembilan.

Legend:

- I/C - Interchange, I/S - Intersection, RSA - Rest and service area, OBR - Overhead bridge restaurant, R/R - Restaurant and rest plaza, L/B - Layby, V/P - Vista point, TN - tunnel, T/P - Toll plaza, BR - Bridge
- C - Cloverleaf, S - Stack, T-A - Trumpet-A, T-B - Trumpet-B, DT - Directional-T/Y, SDT - Semi-Directional-T/Y, P-Y - Partial-Y, D - Diamond, P-C - Partial cloverleaf, D-D - Diverging diamond, D-R - Direct ramp

Location	km	mi	Name	Destinations	Notes
Serting Ulu	0.0	0.0	Serting Ulu	FT 9 Malaysia Federal Route 9 – Pertang, Kuala Klawang, Karak, Bentong, Ulu Serting Recreational Park, Genting Highlands, Serting, Batu Kikir, Kuala Pilah, Sri Menanti, Seremban, Tampin	
Serting Ulu			Sungai Serting bridge		
Ayer Hitam			Jalan Utama Pasoh 2 & 3	Jalan Utama Pasoh 2 & 3 – FELDA Pasoh 2 & 3	
Ayer Hitam			Ayer Hitam Estate		
Ayer Hitam			Ayer Hitam	FT 10 Malaysia Federal Route 10 – Temerloh, Bera, Teriang, Bandar Seri Jempol, Bahau, Gemas, Bandar Tun Abdul Razak, Bandar Muadzam Shah	
1.000 mi = 1.609 km; 1.000 km = 0.621 mi
