= Pak Ka Choon Village =

Coordinates: 2.8034108°N 102.4117942°E

Pak Ka Choon Village Kampung Pak Ka Choon
- Kampung
- Peta Malaysia.

- Flag
- Country: Malaysia
- Negeri: Negeri Sembilan
- Daerah: Bahau
- Kampung: Kampung Pak Ka Choon
- Time zone: GMT +8
- Postal code: 72100
- Area code: +606

Pak Ka Choon Village (Malay: Kampung Pak Ka Choon; simplified Chinese: 马口百家村; traditional Chinese: 馬口百家村; pinyin: mákǒubǎijiācūn; literally: 100 houses village) is a small village located in Bahau, Negeri Sembilan state, Malaysia.

Pak Ka Choon is connected to Bahau town via federal route Jalan Rompin. Even though it is literally named '100 houses village', the village actually consists of 93 shops and houses in total. Its residence mainly consists of Cantonese-speaking Chinese. The postcode is 72100.

== Nearby Town/ Villages ==
- Kampung Bakar Batu
- Taman Cempaka
- Taman Awana Indah
- Rompin
- Mahsan

== Gallery ==
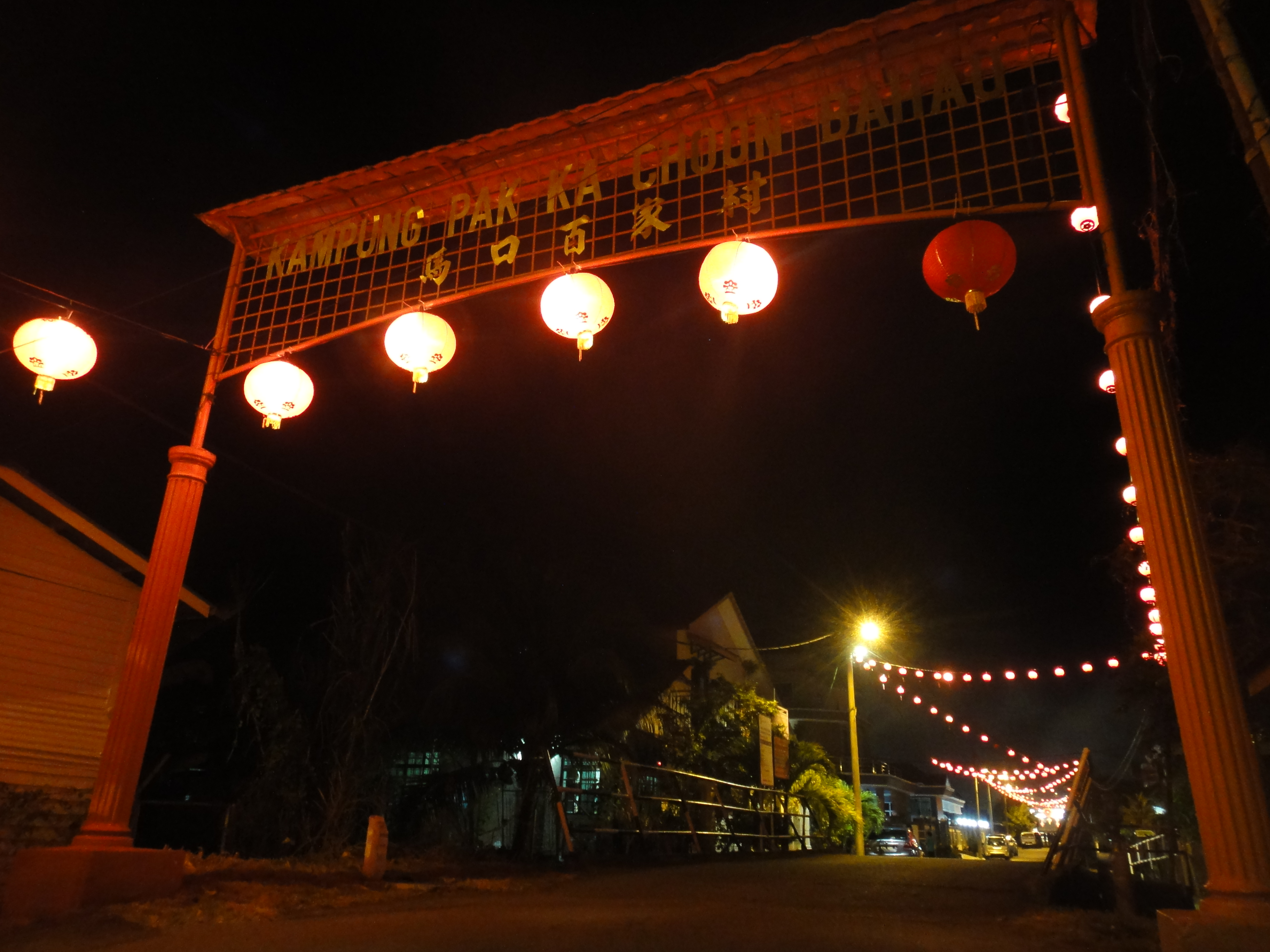
Main entrance of Kampung Pak Ka Choon during Chinese New Year 2019

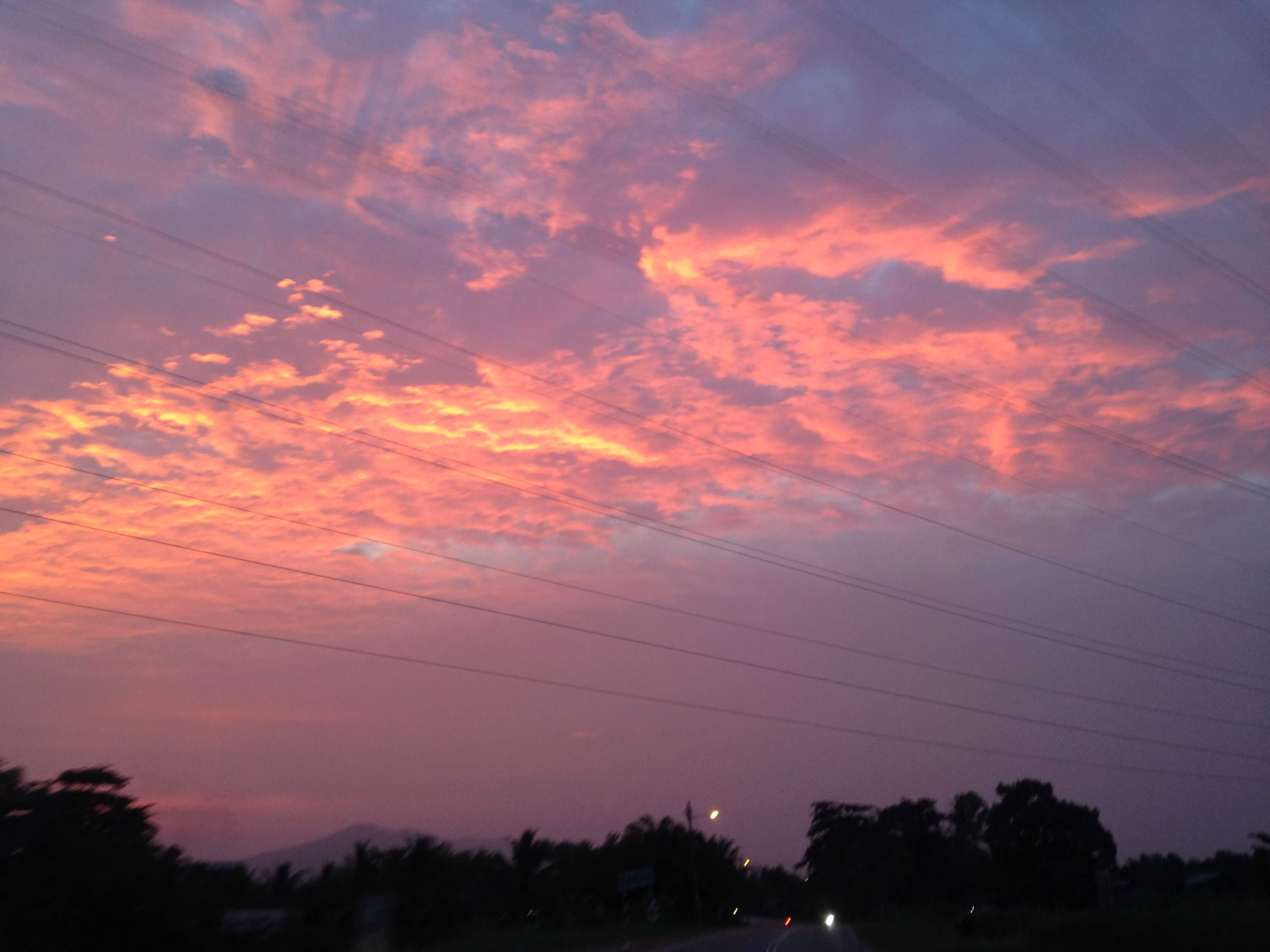
Sunset at Jalan Rompin near Pak Ka Choon Village

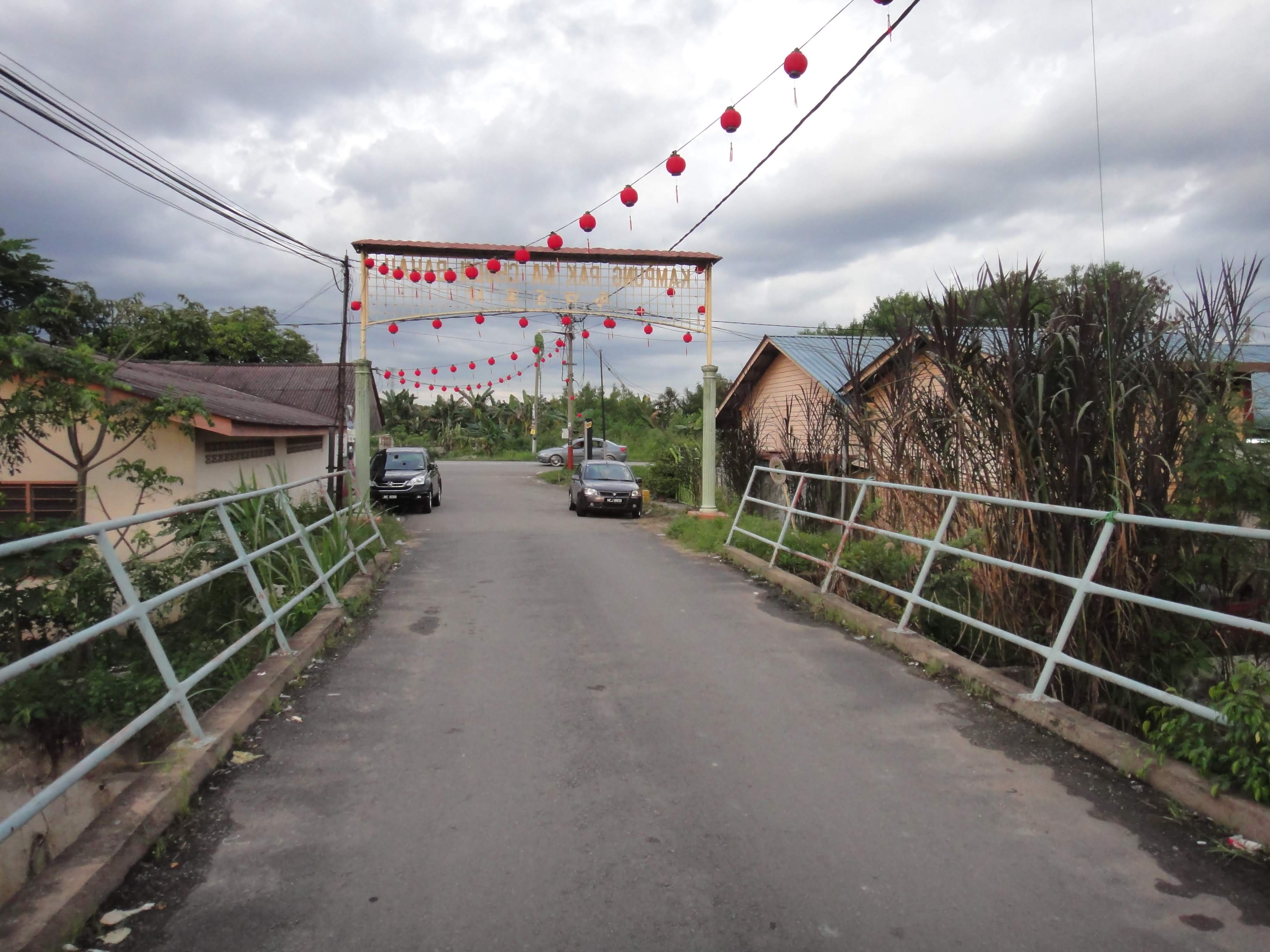
The only bridge in Pak Ka Choon Village leading out of the village to Jalan Rompin till 1990s

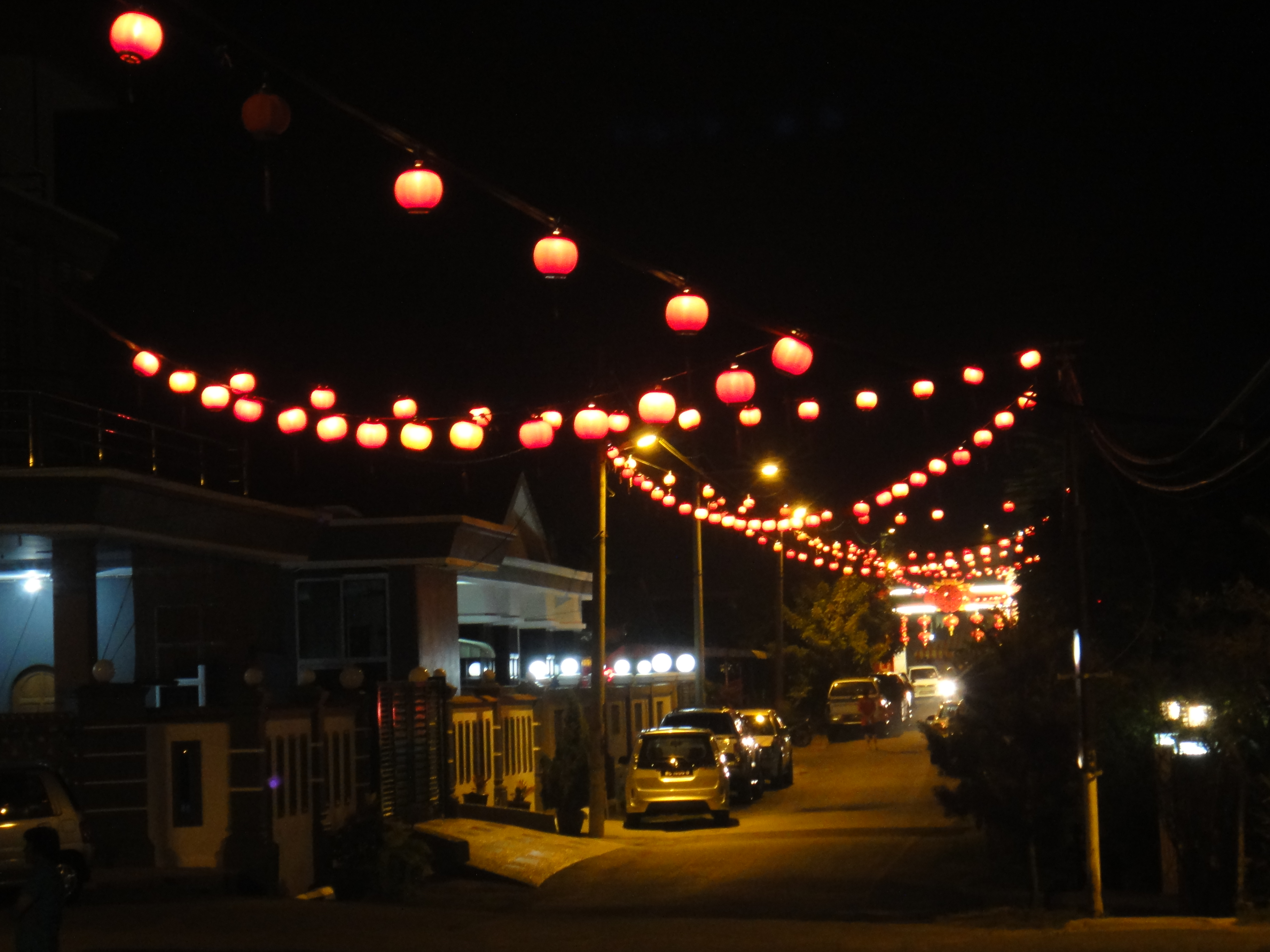
Chinese New Year decoration in Pak Ka Choon Village
