= Batu Kikir =

Malaysian town

Coordinates: 2°50′N 102°19′E

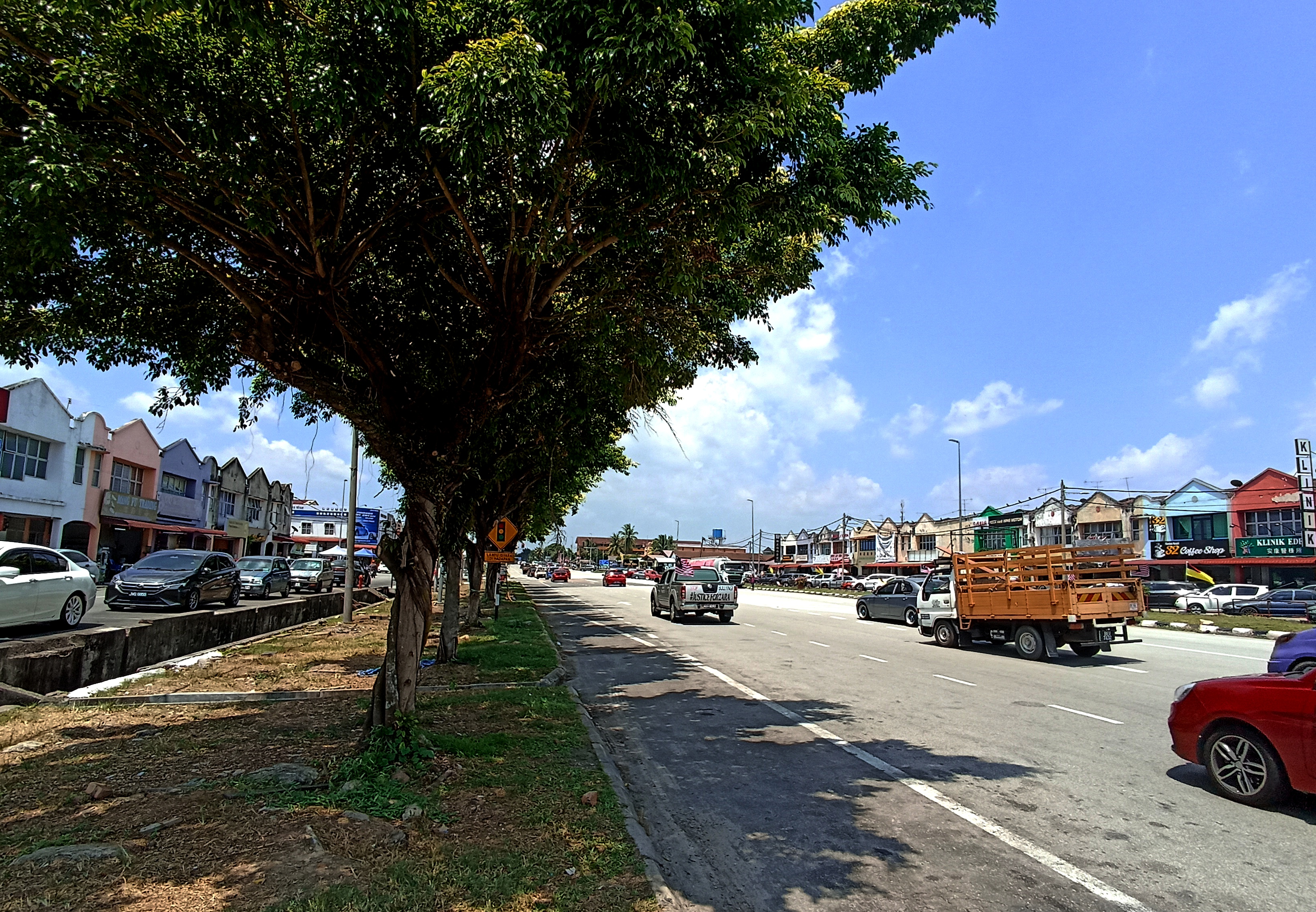
Downtown Batu Kikir

Batu Kikir in Jempol District

Batu Kikir (Negeri Sembilan Malay: Tikey) is a small town in Jempol District, Negeri Sembilan, Malaysia. Situated along the Tampin-Karak highway, Batu Kikir is located in between Bahau and Kuala Pilah.

It is made popular by a phrase Batu Kikir Jambatan Bosi from a line of lyrics of a popular Negri folk song "Apo Kono Eh Jang", a nod to a former truss bridge that spans the Jempol River (right tributary of the Muar River) situated immediately north of the town, which had been the town's landmark until it was replaced by a more modern concrete bridge.

== Tourist attractions ==
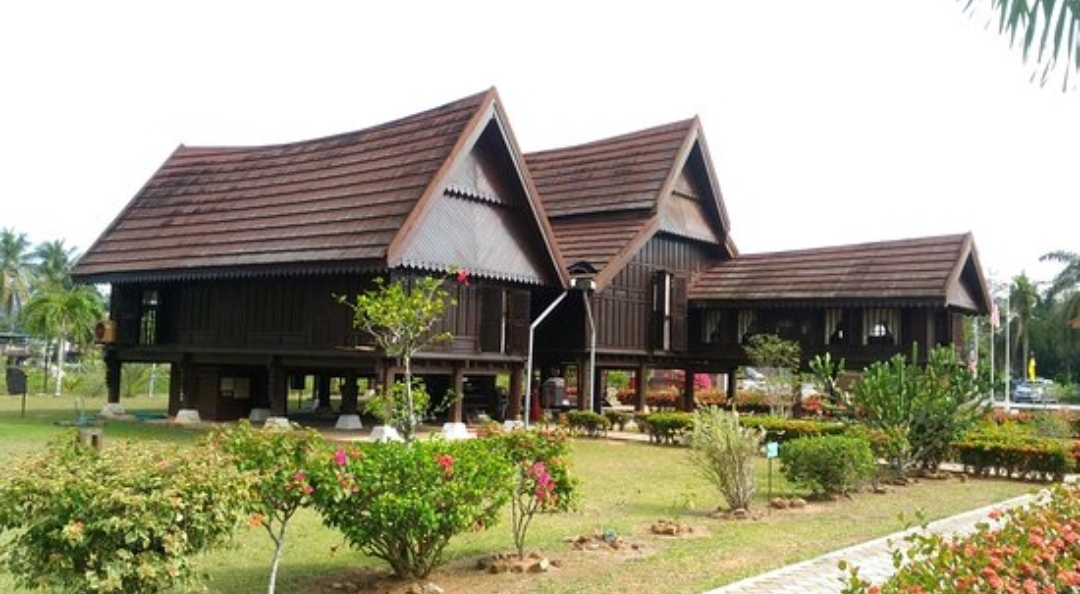
Teratak Za'aba

Batu Kikir is well known as the birthplace of Pendita Za'aba (Zainal Abidin Ahmad), a renowned intellectual and wordsmith in Malaysia. He is the first and only 'Pendita' in the country. A museum dedicated to his legacy has been built by the Negeri Sembilan government and is open to the public. Known as Teratak Za'aba, the traditional kampung house structure was constructed at Za'aba's birthplace, Kampung Bukit Kerdas in Batu Kikir.

Towards the west of town, nestled in the Titiwangsa Range is the Jeram Tengkek Amenity Forest, which has a medium high tiered waterfall and crystal clear streams bridged by wooden pedestrian walkways. The stream flowing from Jeram Tengkek is one of the many tributaries that constitute the Muar River basin. Nearby Jeram Tengkek is Bukit Baginda, which is also a tourist spot for its view and its landmark wave rock formation.

At the east is Kampung Lonek, a place of paddy fields along the road to Bahau, where tourists can experience the originality of a villager's life.

== Schools ==
- SBPI Jempol
- SMK Batu Kikir
- SK Batu Kikir
- SJK (C) Chi Sin
