= Serting =

Serting Soghoteng
- Hamlet
- Location of Serting Serting (Peninsular Malaysia) Serting (Malaysia)
- Coordinates: 2°57′45″N 102°23′1″E
- Country: Malaysia
- State: Negeri Sembilan
- District: Jempol
- Time zone: UTC+8 (MYT)
- Postal code: 72100

Serting in Jempol District

Serting (Negeri Sembilan Malay: Soghoteng, Jawi: سرتيڠ) is a hamlet in Jempol District, Negeri Sembilan, Malaysia. There are many tourist attractions including Gunung Datuk in Serting Hilir. According to the 2021 census, Serting has a population of 5588. The male population is 2858 while the number of females is 2730. The total area of Serting is 2.066 square km. Tourists who want to view the Straits of Melaka take a hike to the peak of Gunung Datuk to get a good 360-degree view.
