= Johol =

Johol Joho (Negeri Sembilan Malay)
- Town
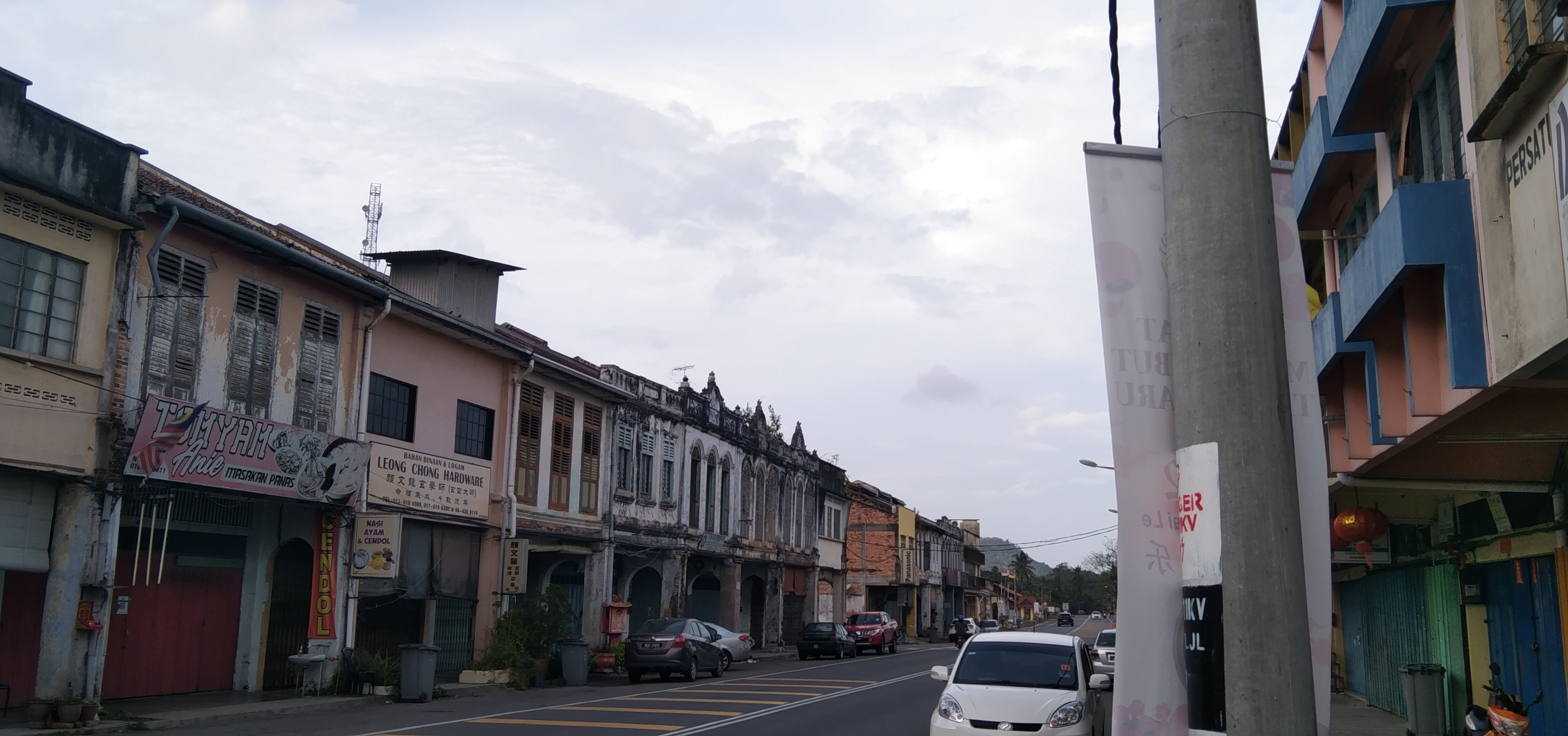
- Johol town centre along Federal Route 9

- Location of Johol Johol (Peninsular Malaysia) Johol (Malaysia)
- Coordinates: 2°36′N 102°16′E
- Country: Malaysia
- State: Negeri Sembilan
- District: Kuala Pilah
- Luak: Johol

Government
  - Body: Kuala Pilah District Council
  - President: Nawal Mohamed Amin
  - MP: Adnan Abu Hassan (BN–UMNO)
  - MLA: Saiful Yazan Sulaiman (BN–UMNO)
- Time zone: UTC+8 (MYT)
- Postal code: 73100

Johol
- Luak Berundang
- Luak Johol
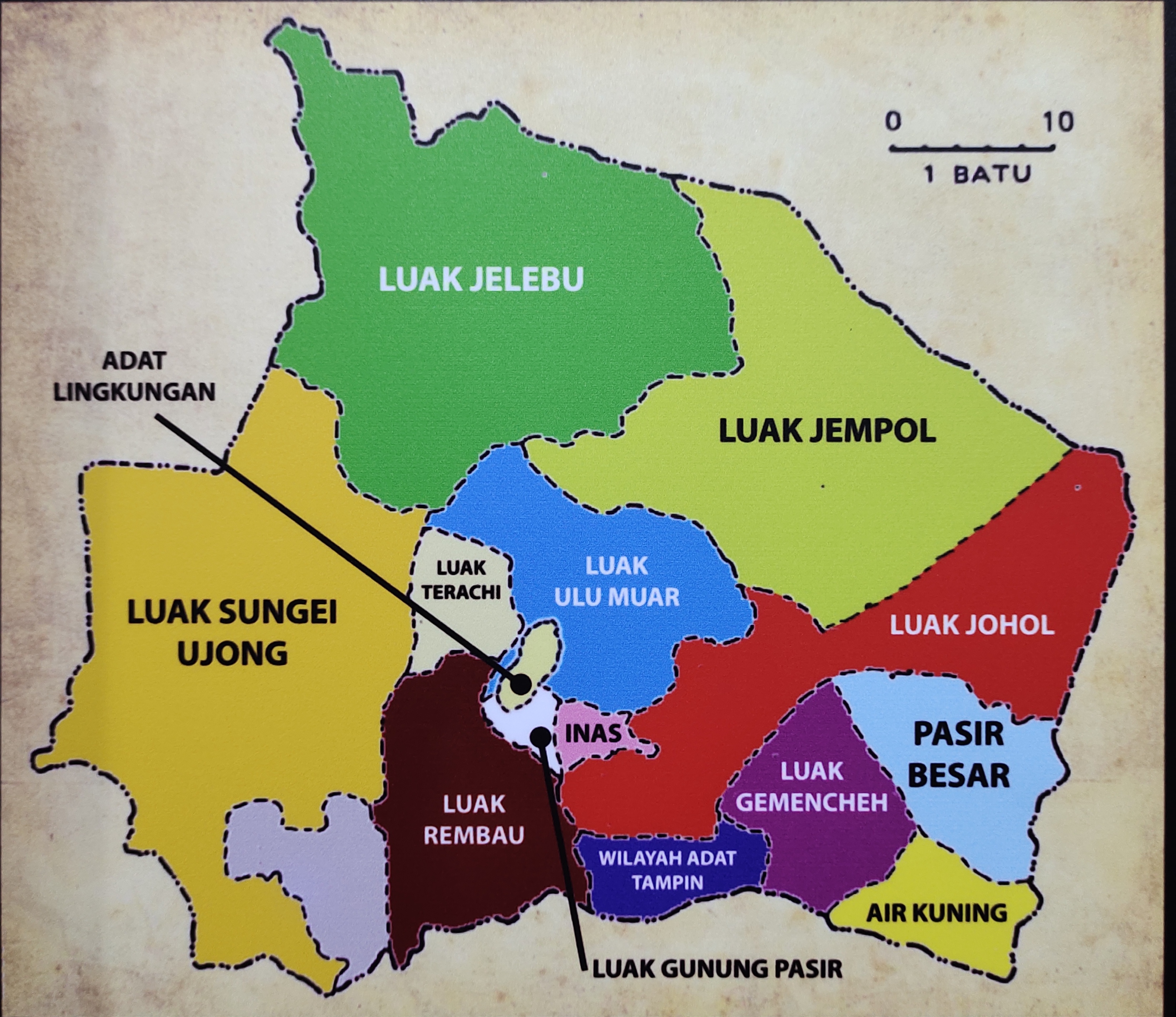
- Luak of Johol relative to other luaks in Negeri Sembilan
- Country: Malaysia
- State: Negeri Sembilan
- Adat institution: Undang of Johol

Government
  - Undang: Muhammed Abdullah
  - Penghulu of Gemencheh: Mohd Kamil Abdul Aziz
  - Penghulu of Ayer Kuning: Mohamad Ghazali Abdul Jalil
  - Penghulu of Pasir Besar: Norhamzaz Buyong

Johol (Negeri Sembilan Malay: Joho) is a town, a mukim and a state assembly constituency in Kuala Pilah District, Negeri Sembilan, Malaysia. It is roughly halfway between Tampin and Kuala Pilah, along FT 9.

Johol in Kuala Pilah District

== Features ==
Johol town houses one of the oldest surviving Shell service stations in the country, dating back to the 1930s. It is located along Jalan Besar FT 9.

== Politics ==
Johol is one of the constituent Minangkabau states, known as luaks, that formed Negeri Sembilan. The reigning Undang of the Luak of Johol (Undang of Johol) is Datuk Johan Pahlawan Lela Perkasa Setiawan Muhammad Abdullah (the 15th Undang). He is one of the four Undangs that participate in the election of the Yamtuan Besar of Negeri Sembilan; the other three are from Sungai Ujong (which included the capital Seremban and Port Dickson), Jelebu and Rembau.

Johol is part of the parliamentary constituency of Kuala Pilah. Johol is also a constituency of the Negeri Sembilan State Legislative Assembly.
