= Kuala Pilah (town) =

Kuala Pilah Kolo Pilah (Negeri Sembilan Malay)
- Town and district capital
- Kuala Pilah Town; Bandar Kuala Pilah
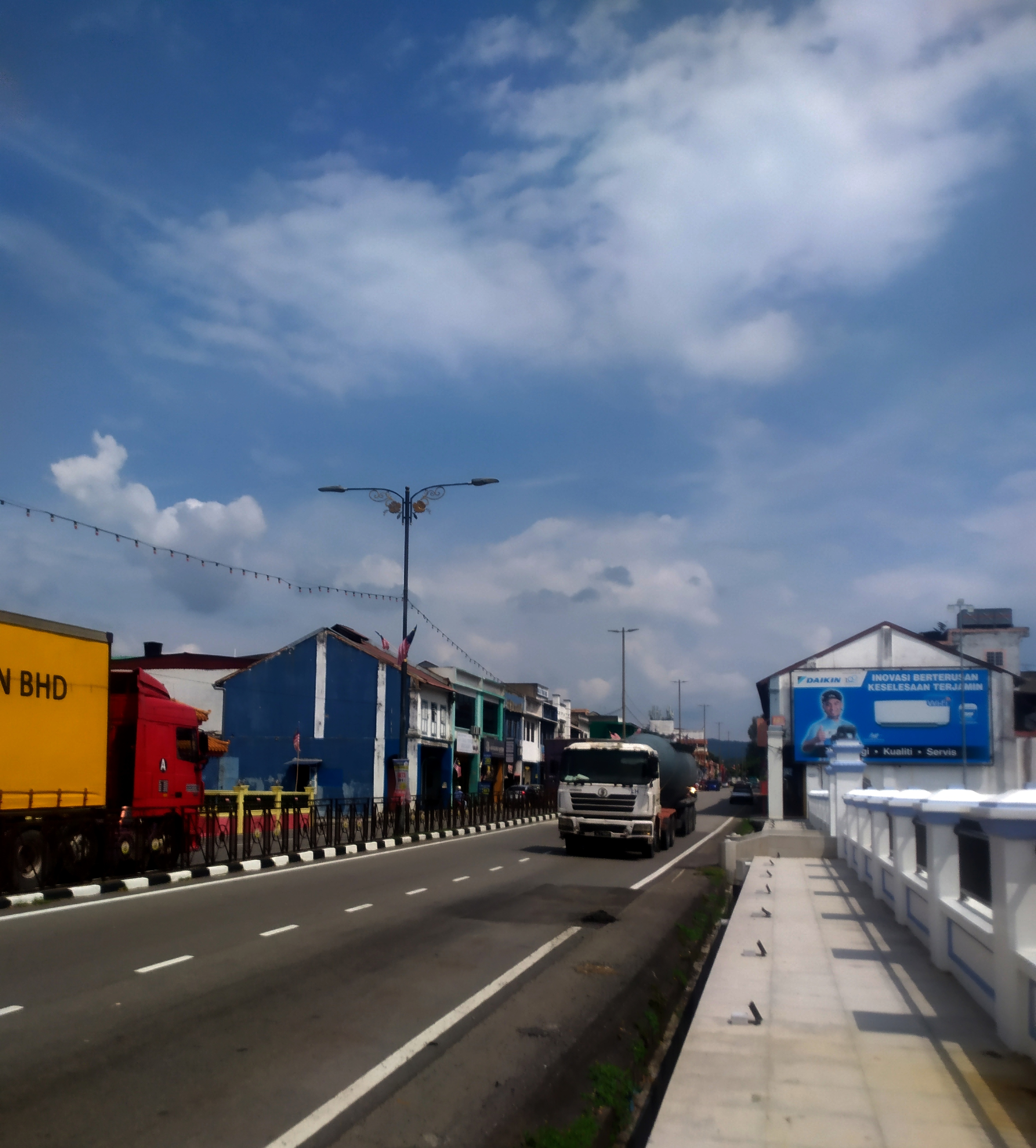
- Route FT 9, downtown Kuala Pilah

- Kuala Pilah Town in Kuala Pilah District

- Location of Kuala Pilah in Peninsular Malaysia Kuala Pilah (Peninsular Malaysia) Kuala Pilah (Malaysia)
- Coordinates: 2°44′19.6″N 102°14′57.5″E
- Country: Malaysia
- State: Negeri Sembilan
- District: Kuala Pilah
- Luak: Ulu Muar

Government
  - Type: Local government
  - Body: Kuala Pilah District Council
  - President: Nawal Mohamed Amin
  - MP: Adnan Abu Hassan (BN–UMNO)
  - MLA: S Leza Md Yasin (BN–UMNO)
- Elevation: 93 m (305 ft)
- Time zone: UTC+8 (MST)
- Postcode: 72xxx
- Website: www.mdkp.gov.my

Kuala Pilah District Council Majlis Daerah Kuala Pilah
- Local Government Act 1976

Type
- Type: Local authority

History
- Founded: June 1980

Leadership
- President: Mohd Faizal Abdul Manap
- District secretary: Amin Jamail Thamimul Ansary

Motto
- Indah, Makmur (Beautiful, Prosperous)

Meeting place
- 72009 Kuala Pilah, Negeri Sembilan Darul Khusus

Website
- www.mdkp.gov.my

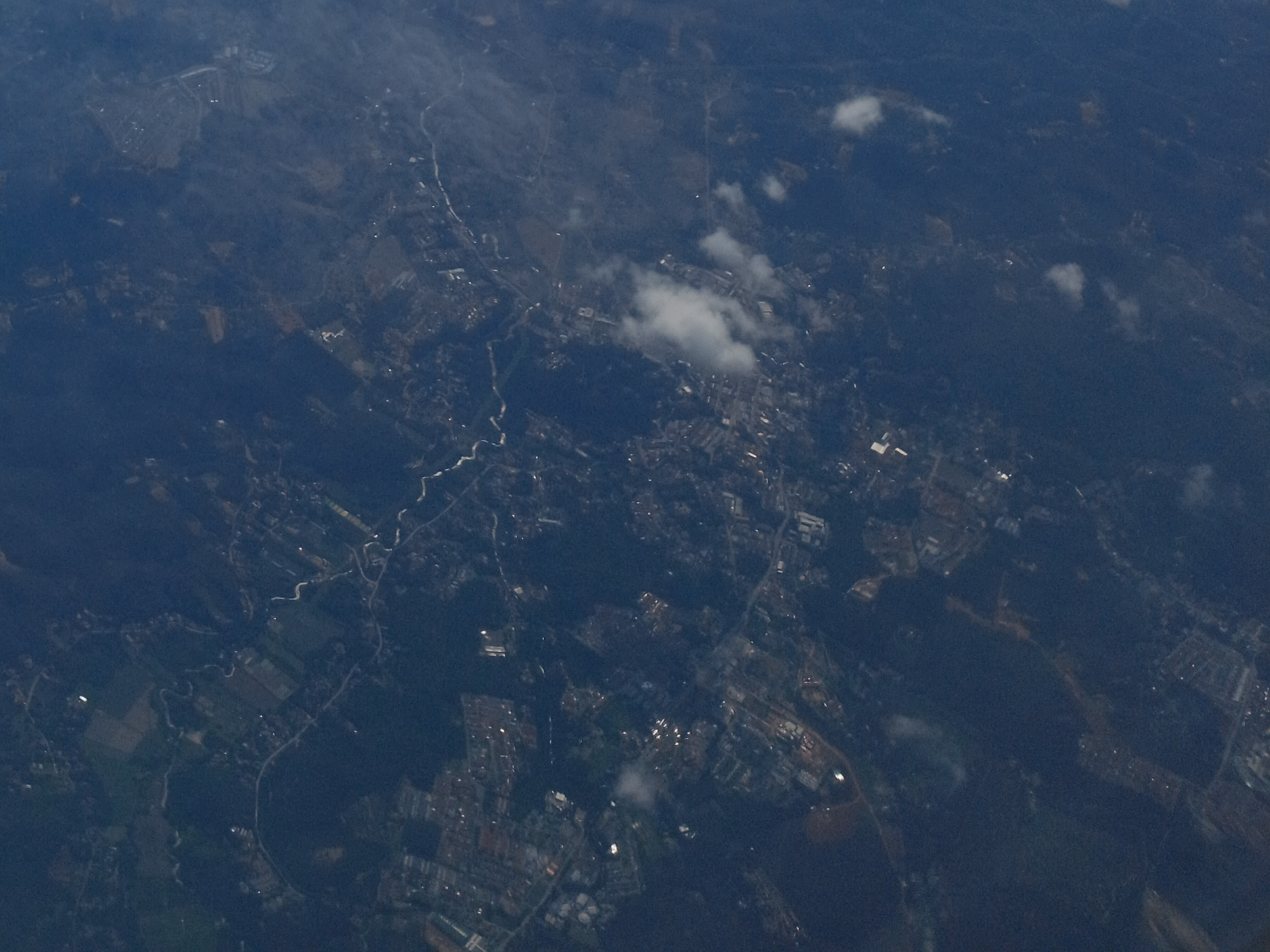
Aerial view of Kuala Pilah

Kuala Pilah (Negeri Sembilan Malay: Kolo Pilah), or simply Pilah, is a town in Kuala Pilah District, Negeri Sembilan, Malaysia. It is 36 km from the state capital Seremban and 101 km from Kuala Lumpur.

== Townscape ==
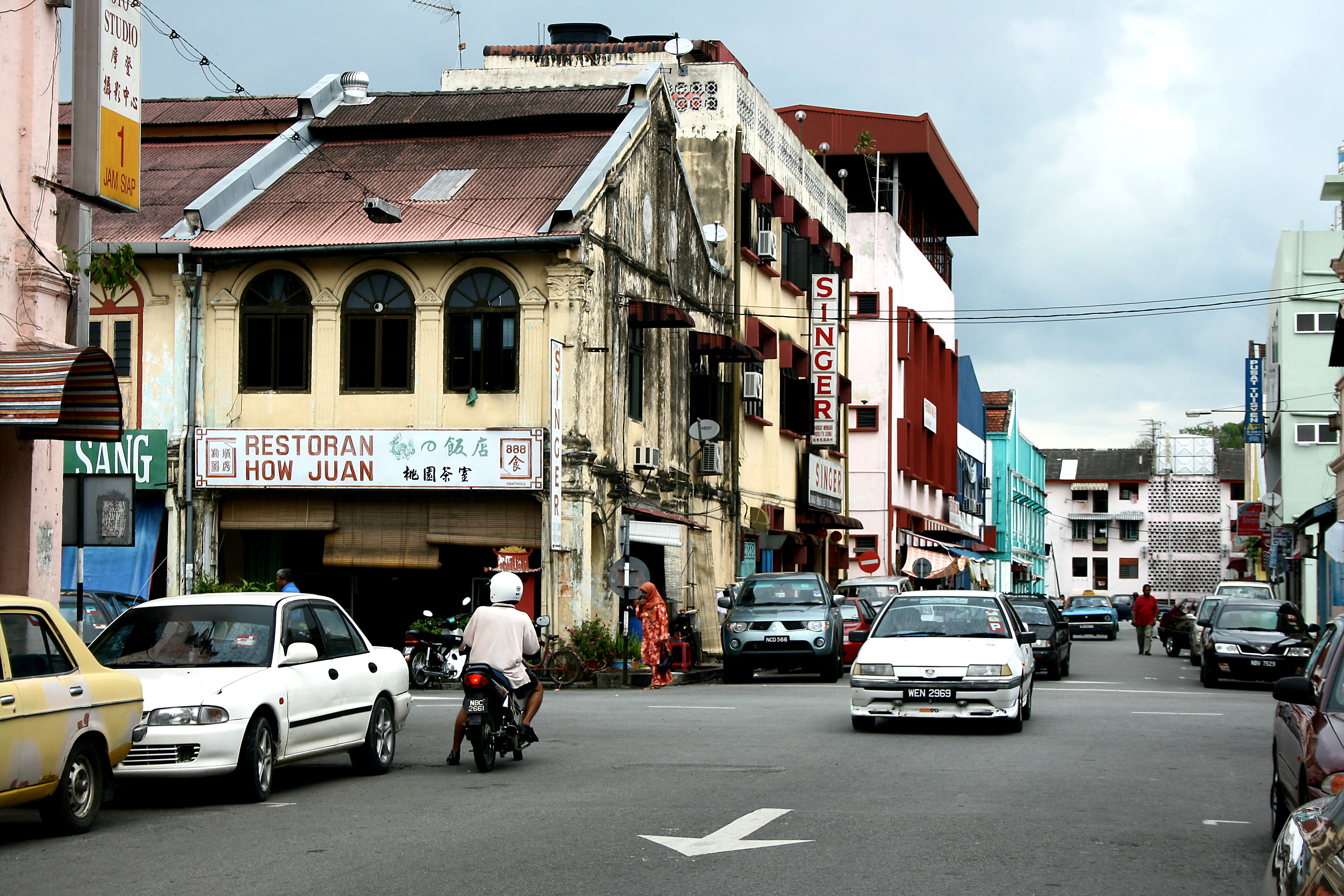
Shophouses line the streets in downtown Kuala Pilah

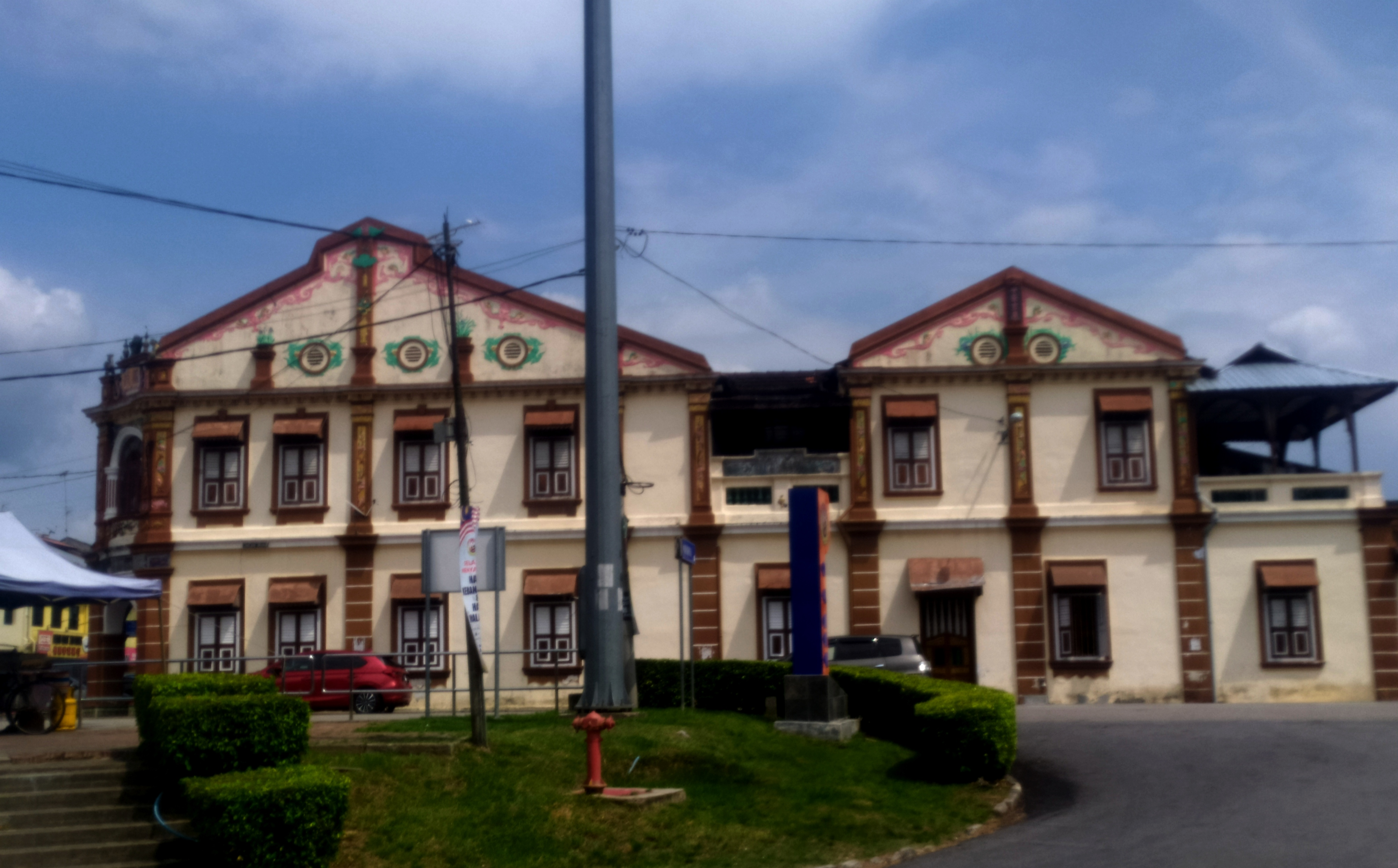
An ornate shophouse within downtown Kuala Pilah

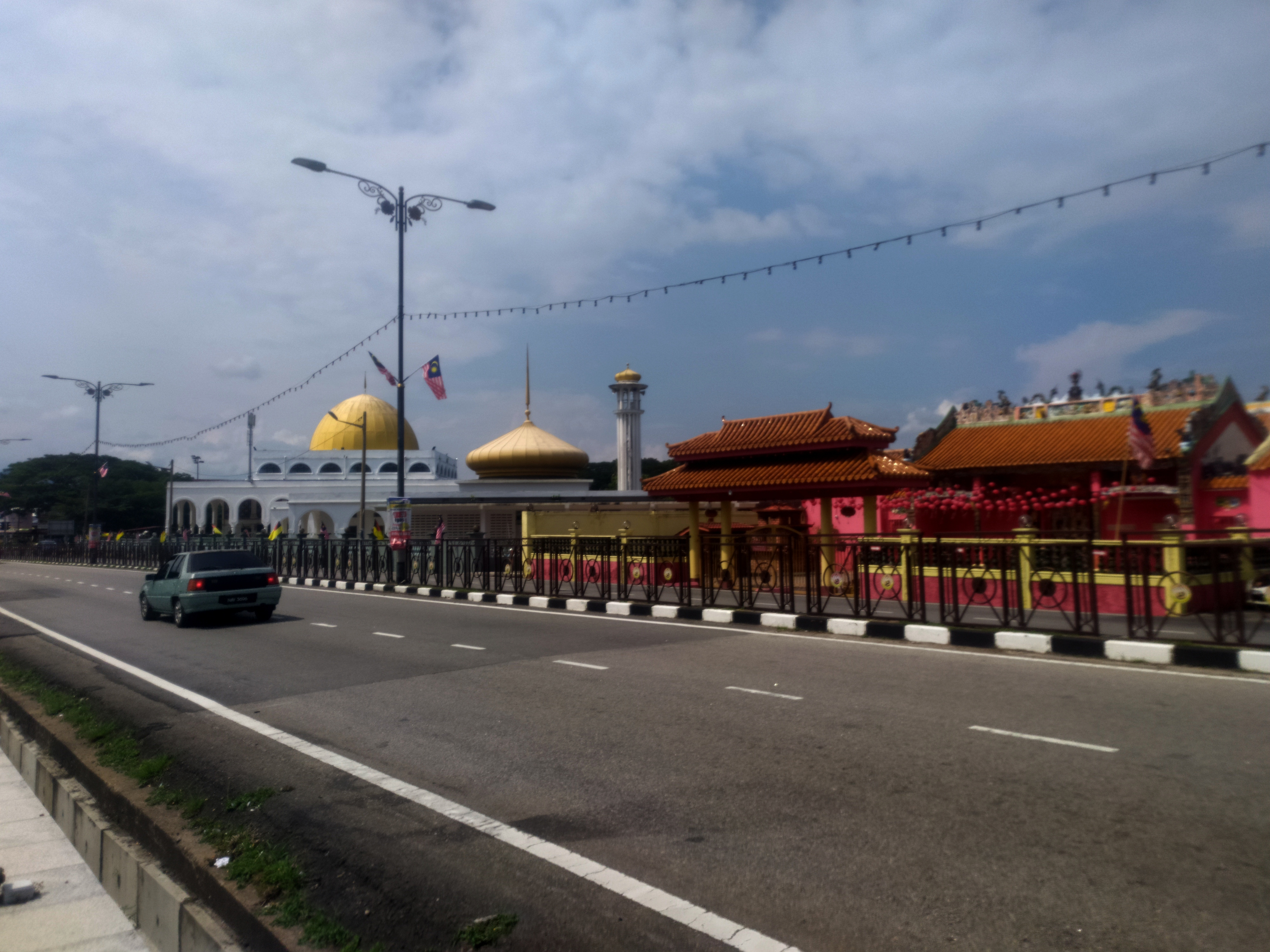
Yamtuan Raden Mosque and Sam Seng Keong Temple

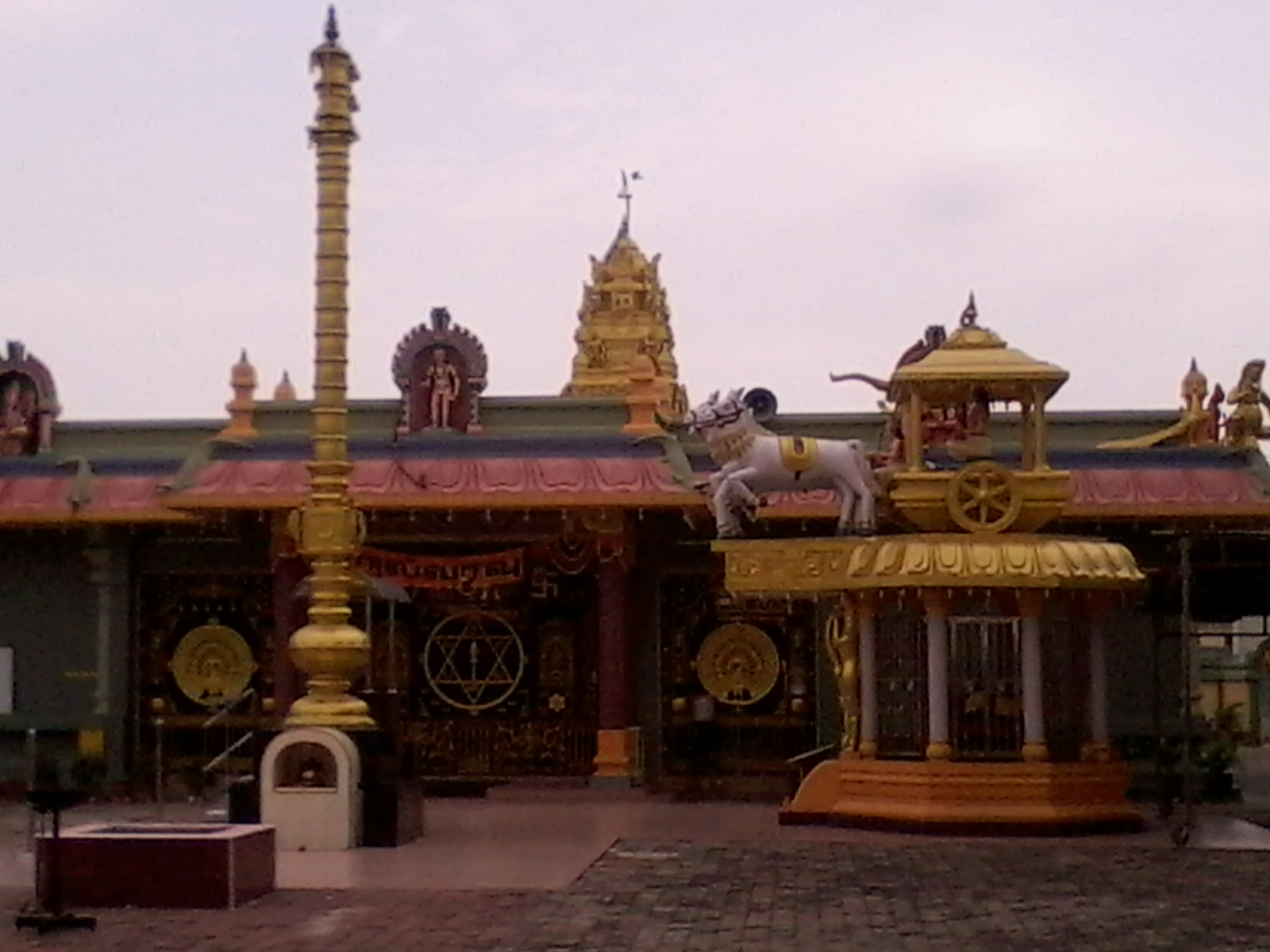
Arulmiku Kanthasamy Temple

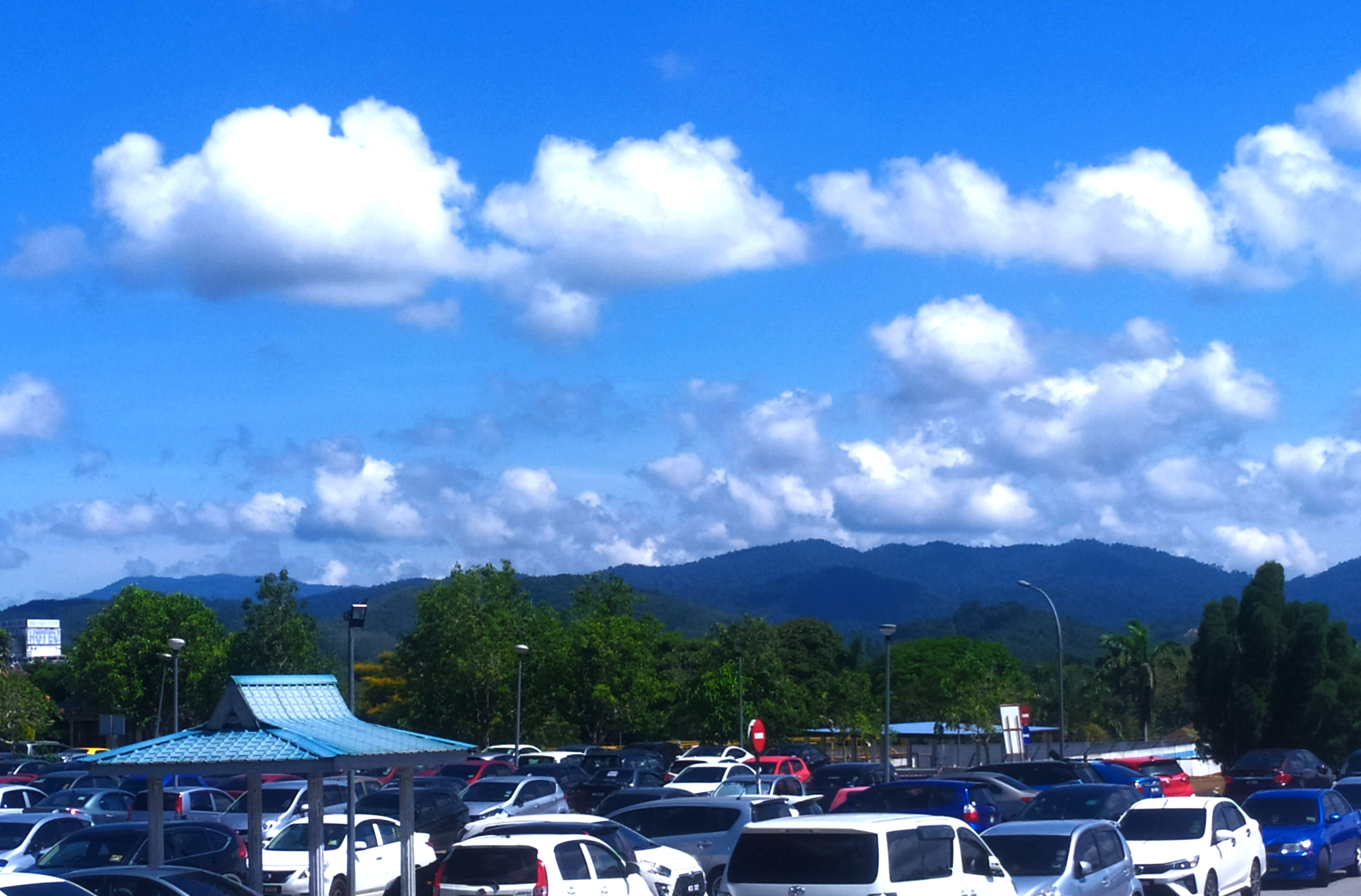
The Negri Titiwangsa seen from the town.

Kuala Pilah is situated at the upstream section of the Muar River on the eastern slopes of the Titiwangsa Mountains. It is an old valley town with many of the prewar Chinese shophouses still fronting the main streets surrounded by traditional Malay kampung houses built on stilts nestled among extensive rice fields. It has a sizeable Chinese community that has existed since the mining days during the early British rule. This community today engages in trading and providing essential services such as workshops, hairdressing and traditional coffee shops called kopitiams.

The town is especially busy on weekends due to the flood of folks returning from Kuala Lumpur, usually to visit their parents or to tend to their family plots, where around the area is mostly Malays that migrated to Kuala Lumpur in search of better prospects and 'the bright lights'. The town is quite empty at night as most of the shops close as early as 7 p.m. daily. But early mornings are busy as workers and residents were staying nearby going to work at government offices such as hospitals, district offices and schools.

There are not many food stalls around, most are limited to the junction between Kuala Pilah and Bahau. The town used to have a movie theatre, but it was closed due to the introduction of video and internet cafes that sprouted during the 1990s. Those internet cafes are still going strong today.

The town is where one can also find the old Kuala Pilah Rest House, which was built by the government during the British occupation. In the early years, rest houses were the only available hotels and where everyone from businessmen to travellers stayed. It still serves this purpose today, albeit in a diminished capacity due to the availability of alternative accommodations.

== Politics ==
Currently, P129 Kuala Pilah is represented in the Dewan Rakyat of the Malaysian Parliament by Dato' Haji Adnan Abu Hassan of UMNO, a component party of Barisan Nasional, which forms a major portion of the current government coalition.

In turn, Kuala Pilah provides five seats to the Negeri Sembilan State Legislative Assembly, namely:

- Juasseh;
- Seri Menanti, the royal town;
- Senaling;
- Pilah, which included downtown Kuala Pilah; and
- Johol.

Four state seats are currently held by UMNO save for downtown Kuala Pilah, which is held by PKR.

== Healthcare ==
=== Public hospitals ===
The nearest hospital is Hospital Tuanku Ampuan Najihah, located at the main road towards Seremban (Federal Route 51).

== Tourist attractions ==
=== Ulu Bendul ===
Ulu Bendul eco-forest park is a recreational forest located 24 km from Seremban, accessible by private vehicles, buses, or taxis. It is nestled in the Angsi Forest Reserve, offers a blend of lowland dipterocarp and hill dipterocarp forests

==== Mount Angsi ====
The summit of Mount Angsi is the main attraction, with height at 825 metres above sea level, accessible through an 8.89 km trail from Bukit Putus. There are long cabins for mountain climbers, tracks for hikers and jungle paths for the adventures.

==== Python Park ====
Python Park (in Malay "Taman Ular Sawa") is situated in compartment 45 of the Angsi Forest within the Ulu Bendul Eco-Forest Park, the 4-hectare Ulu Bendul Python Park aims to collect and safeguard endangered snake species, particularly pythons. The park's establishment is expected to enhance Ulu Bendul Recreational Forest's appeal as an eco-tourist destination. It was opened to public in March 2008.

Among the python species that is available in the python park are the Colombia Rainbow boa (Epicratus cenchria maurus), Brazilian Rainbow boa (Epicratus cenchria chenchria), Green anaconda (Eunectes murinus), Carpet python (Morelia spilota), Sumatran short-tailed python (Python curtus), Green Burmese python (Python molurus bivittatus), and Reticulated python (Python reticulatus).

=== Martin Lister memorial arch ===
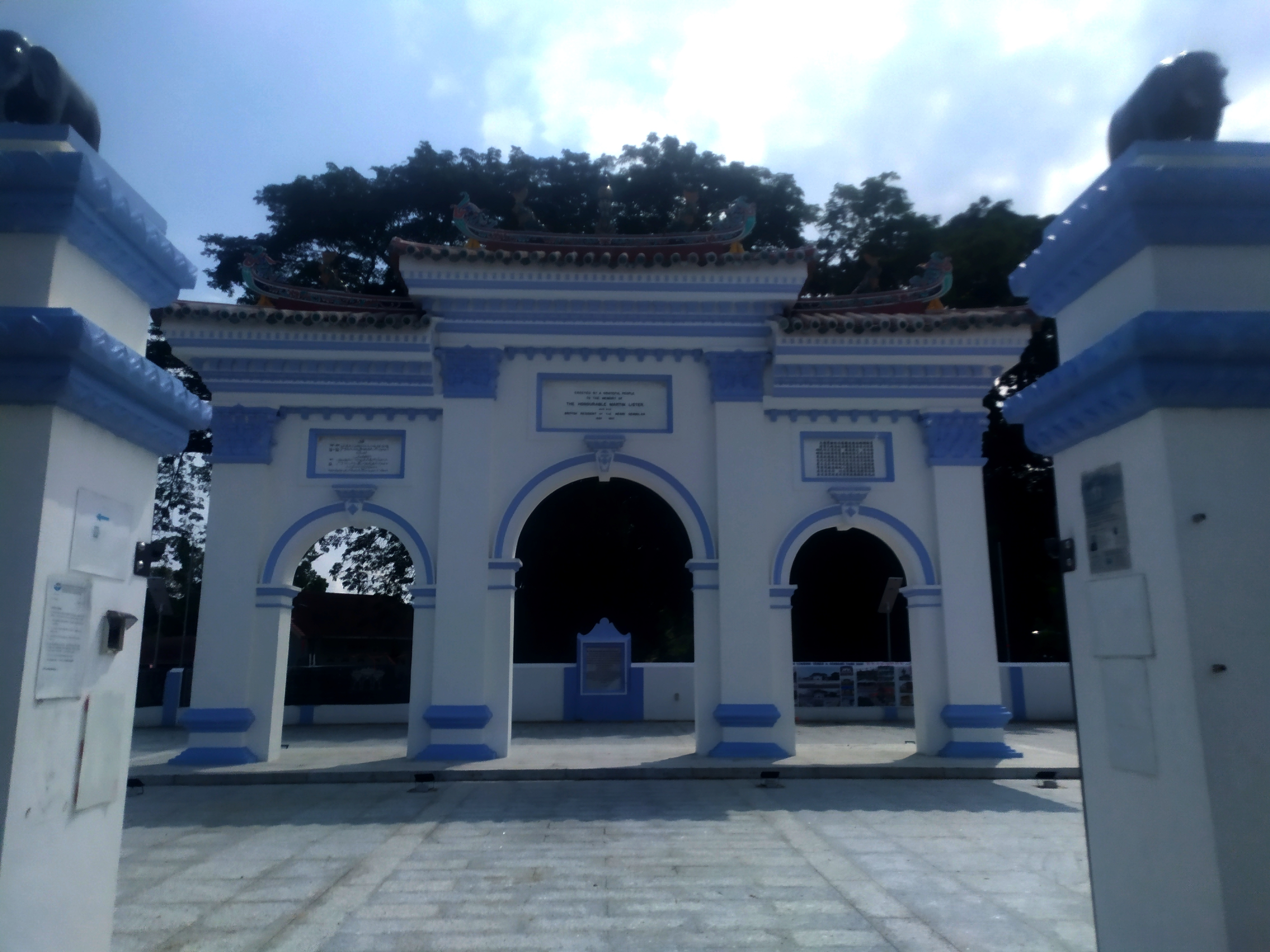
The Lister Memorial Arch

On the main road is a Chinese-styled arch dedicated to Martin Lister, who was the first British Resident of Negeri Sembilan, commemorating his effort in ending the intermittent violent conflict between Chinese secret societies then rampant among the migrant Chinese populace. Lister died in 1897 in Suez from deteriorating health.

== Transportation ==
The town itself serves as the main stopover point for transport routes.

=== Car ===
Kuala Pilah is an important rest town for travellers using Federal Route 9, which runs through downtown Kuala Pilah. This highway, beginning in Tampin near the Negeri Sembilan-Malacca border and ending in Karak in western Pahang, is the main route for motorists from Malacca and Negeri Sembilan heading to the east coast states of Pahang, Terengganu and Kelantan while bypassing Kuala Lumpur/the Klang Valley.

Meanwhile, Kuala Pilah is connected to the state capital, Seremban by Federal Route 51.

=== Bus ===
There are a new Bus Station and Taxi Stand located in the middle of Kuala Pilah Town and services to Seremban, Kuala Lumpur, Tampin, Bahau and Gemas are available—also to the East Coast towns of Kuantan and Kuala Terengganu. People from Segamat and parts of Pahang use this route through Kuala Pilah to go to Kuala Lumpur via Seremban.

=== Train ===
There used to be a branch line connecting Kuala Pilah to Bahau; the branch line was closed in 1931 due to the Great Depression; the tracks were soon dismantled.

Currently state railway operator KTMB does not serve Kuala Pilah. The closest stations are KB13 Seremban and KB14 Senawang for the West Coast Railway, and Bahau for the East Coast Jungle Railway.

== Notable natives ==
- Ghafar Baba (1925–2006), Deputy Prime Minister (1986–1993)
- Ismail Lasim, Menteri Besar of Negeri Sembilan
- Maimunah Mohd Sharif, Mayor of Kuala Lumpur
- Rosmah Mansor, the second wife of former Prime Minister of Malaysia, Najib Razak
- Shamsiah Fakeh (1924–2008), communist activist and leader of Angkatan Wanita Sedar
