= Jempol District =

District in Negeri Sembilan, Malaysia

Jempol District Jompo (Negeri Sembilan Malay)
- District of Negeri Sembilan
- Daerah Jempol
- Seal
- Interactive map of Jempol District
- Location of Jempol District in Malaysia
- Coordinates: 2°55′N 102°25′E
- Country: Malaysia
- State: Negeri Sembilan
- Seat: Bandar Seri Jempol
- Local area government(s): Jempol Municipal Council

Government
  - District officer: Zazali Salehudin

Area
  - Total: 1,490.87 km^{2} (575.63 sq mi)

Population (2010)
  - Total: 112,354
  - Density: 75.3614/km^{2} (195.185/sq mi)
- Time zone: UTC+8 (MST)
  - Summer (DST): UTC+8 (Not observed)
- Postcode: 72xxx
- Calling code: +6-06
- Vehicle registration plates: N

Jempol Municipal Council Majlis Perbandaran Jempol

Type
- Type: Local authority

History
- Founded: 29 January 2019
- Preceded by: Jempol District Council

Leadership
- President: Mohd Nazri Mulup

Meeting place
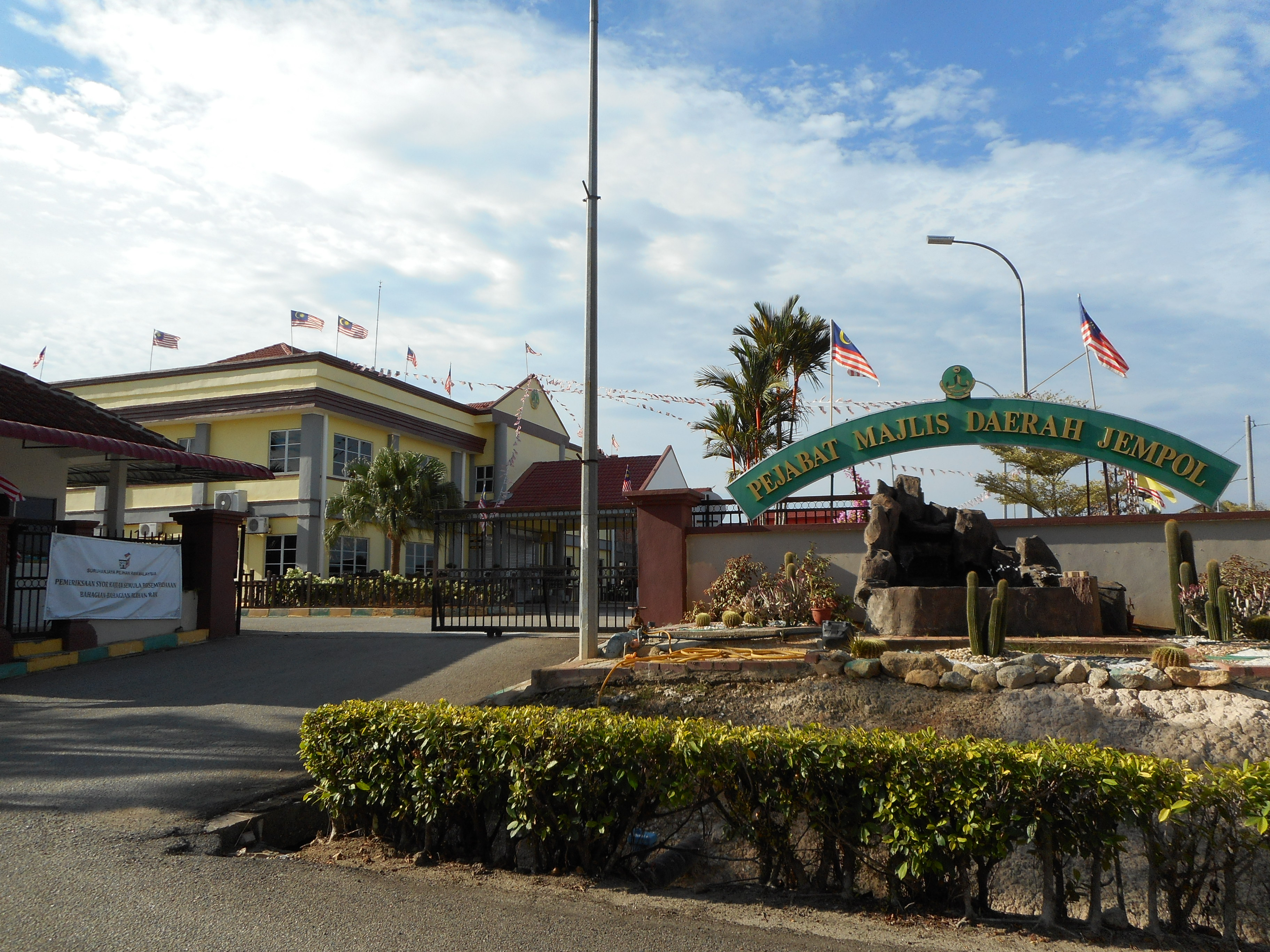
- 72120 Bandar Seri Jempol, Negeri Sembilan Darul Khusus

Website
- www.mdjl.gov.my

Jempol
- Luak Tanah Mengandung
- Luak Jempol
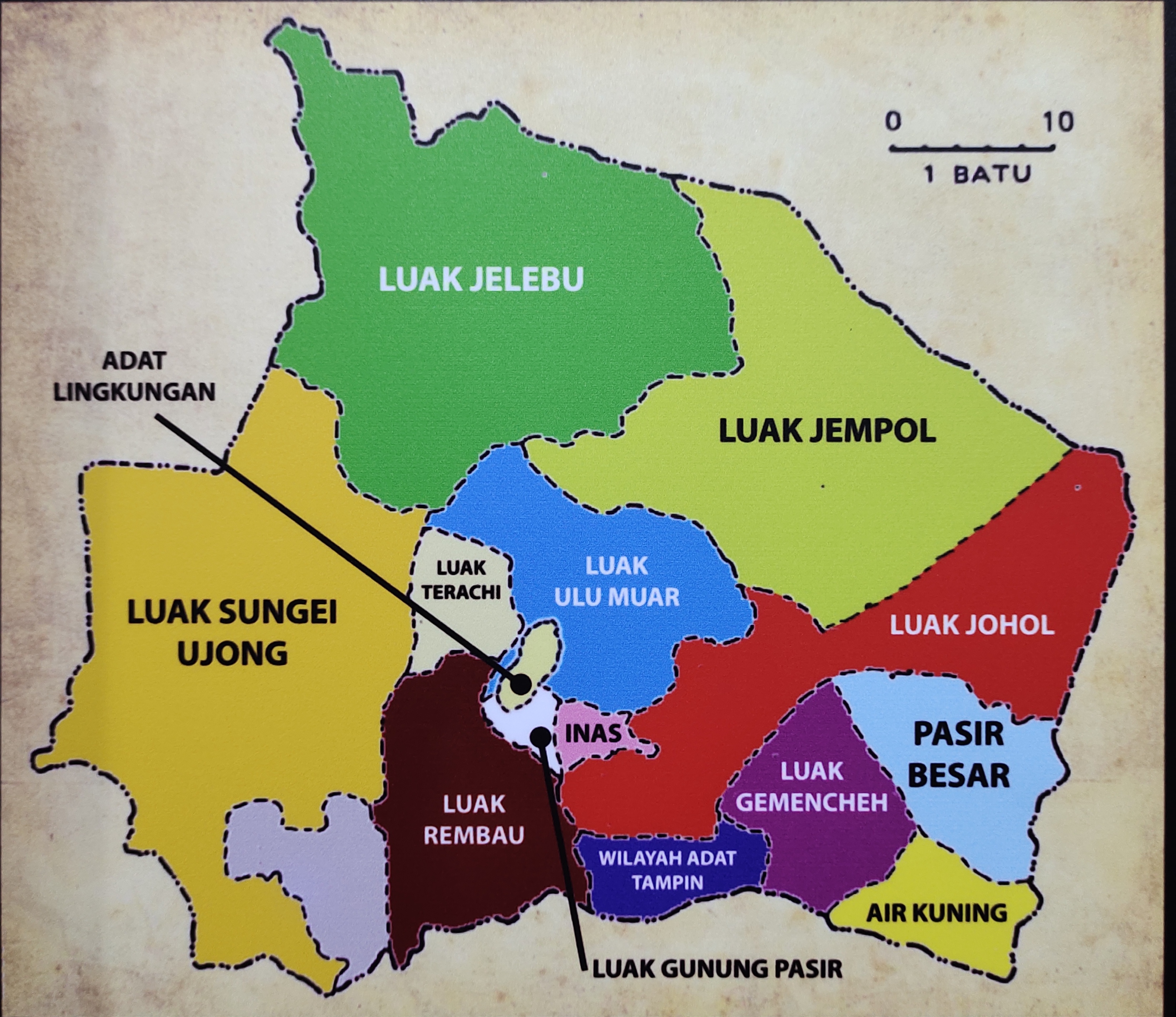
- Luak of Jempol relative to other luaks in Negeri Sembilan
- Country: Malaysia
- State: Negeri Sembilan
- Adat institution: Yang di-Pertuan Besar of Negeri Sembilan

Government
  - Penghulu: Mazri Mansol

The Jempol District (Negeri Sembilan Malay: Jompo) is the largest district in the Malaysian state of Negeri Sembilan. The district borders Jelebu District to the northwest, Kuala Pilah District to the west, Tampin District to the south, Bera District, Pahang to the northeast and Segamat District, Johor to the east. Bandar Seri Jempol and Bahau are the principal towns in Jempol.

Jempol is also the meeting point of Muar and Serting rivers. The meeting point had played an important transportation role in ancient times. Known historically as Jalan Penarikan, it connected trade posts west of the Malay Peninsula with population centres in the east coast and vice versa.

== Hospital ==
Jempol is equipped with a hospital funded by the Malaysian Ministry of Health. The hospital is the main health care provider in Jempol and its surrounding areas including Serting and Bahau. Residents of Rompin mukim and other nearby areas in Pahang (particularly Bera which borders this district and Negeri Sembilan state in particular) that used to seek treatment in Kuala Pilah have started to visit the hospital. Bahau is 21 km away from Kuala Pilah.

== Administrative divisions ==

Jempol District is divided into 5 mukims, which are:

- Jelai
- Kuala Jempol
- Rompin
- Serting Ilir (Capital)
- Serting Ulu

From a traditional adat perspective, Serting Ulu, Serting Ilir and Kuala Jempol and the western portion of Rompin form the Luak of Jempol, which is part of the Luak Tanah Mengandung – peripheral luaks that surround the royal territory of Seri Menanti and under the governance of the Yamtuan Besar. On the other hand, the eastern portion of Rompin, as well as Jelai in the district's southern salient are part of the Luak of Johol, a Luak Berundang – a set of four luaks under the administration of an Undang, the other being Jelebu, Sungai Ujong and Rembau.

== Government and politics ==
Jempol Municipal Council (Malay: Majlis Perbandaran Jempol), formerly known as the Jempol District Council from 1 August 1980 until 29 January 2019, is the local authority of Jempol District.

== Demographics ==
Historical population
Year	Pop.	±%
1991	122,033	—
2000	125,010	+2.4%
2010	112,740	−9.8%
2020	127,181	+12.8%

== Transportation ==
=== Car ===
Federal Route 10 is the main route serving Jempol constituency, passing through downtown Bahau and touching Bandar Seri Jempol before continuing to Temerloh, Pahang.

Bera Highway Federal Route 11 cuts through Jempol constituency in an east-west direction, beginning in Serting and ending near Bandar Tun Abdul Razak in southern Pahang.

Federal Route 13 links Bahau to Juasseh in Kuala Pilah constituency.

=== Public transportation ===
Bahau KTM is the principal railway station serving this constituency.

== Notable natives ==
- Fish Leong, singer
- Aishah, singer, actress, and politician
- Za'aba, scholar and linguist

== Federal Parliament and State Assembly Seats ==
List of Jempol district representatives in the Federal Parliament (Dewan Rakyat)

Parliament	Seat Name	Member of Parliament	Party
P126	Jelebu	Jalaluddin Alias	Barisan Nasional (UMNO)
P127	Jempol	Shamshulkahar Mohd Deli	Barisan Nasional (UMNO)

List of Jempol district representatives in the State Legislative Assembly (Dewan Undangan Negeri)

Parliament	State	Seat Name	State Assemblyman	Party
P126	N3	Sungai Lui	Mohd Razi Mohd Ali	Barisan Nasional (UMNO)
P127	N5	Serting	Mohd Fairuz Mohd Isa	Perikatan Nasional (PAS)
P127	N6	Palong	Mustapha Nagoor	Barisan Nasional (UMNO)
P127	N7	Jeram Padang	Mohd Zaidy Abdul Kadir	Barisan Nasional (UMNO)
P127	N8	Bahau	Teo Kok Seong	Pakatan Harapan (DAP)

== See also ==
- Districts of Malaysia
