= Kuala Pilah District =

District in Negeri Sembilan, Malaysia

Kuala Pilah District Kolo Pilah (Negeri Sembilan Malay)
- District of Negeri Sembilan
- Daerah Kuala Pilah
- Seal
- Interactive map of Kuala Pilah District
- Location of Kuala Pilah District in Malaysia
- Coordinates: 2°45′N 102°15′E
- Country: Malaysia
- State: Negeri Sembilan
- Seat: Kuala Pilah
- Local area government(s): Kuala Pilah District Council

Government
  - District officer: Syahru Nizam Saleh

Area
  - Total: 1,090.40 km^{2} (421.01 sq mi)

Population (2010)
  - Total: 64,120
  - Density: 58.80/km^{2} (152.3/sq mi)
- Time zone: UTC+8 (MST)
  - Summer (DST): UTC+8 (Not observed)
- Postcode: 72xxx
- Calling code: +6-06
- Vehicle registration plates: N

The Kuala Pilah District (Negeri Sembilan Malay: Kolo Pilah) is a district in central Negeri Sembilan, Malaysia. Its seat is the town of Kuala Pilah.

Kuala Pilah District borders Jelebu District to the north, Jempol District to the east, Tampin District to the southwest and Rembau and Seremban Districts to the west.

== Administrative divisions ==

Kuala Pilah District is divided into 11 mukims, which are:

- Ampang Tinggi
- Johol
- Juasseh
- Kepis
- Langkap
- Parit Tinggi
- Pilah (Capital)
- Seri Menanti
- Terachi
- Ulu Jempol
- Ulu Muar

The district also home to Seri Menanti, the official residence of the Yang di-Pertuan Besar of Negeri Sembilan.

== Demographics ==
Historical population
Year	Pop.	±%
1991	68,180	—
2000	63,541	−6.8%
2010	63,874	+0.5%
2020	70,324	+10.1%

== Federal Parliament and State Assembly Seats ==
List of Kuala Pilah district representatives in the Federal Parliament (Dewan Rakyat)

Parliament	Seat Name	Member of Parliament	Party
P129	Kuala Pilah	Adnan Abu Hassan	Barisan Nasional (UMNO)

List of Kuala Pilah district representatives in the State Legislative Assembly (Dewan Undangan Negeri)

Parliament	State	Seat Name	State Assemblyman	Party
P129	N15	Juasseh	Ismail Lasim	Barisan Nasional (UMNO)
P129	N16	Seri Menanti	Muhammad Sufian Maradzi	Barisan Nasional (UMNO)
P129	N17	Senaling	Mohamad Qayyum Abu Jalil	Barisan Nasional (UMNO)
P129	N18	Pilah	S Leza Md Yasin	Barisan Nasional (UMNO)
P129	N19	Johol	Saiful Yazan Sulaiman	Barisan Nasional (UMNO)

== See also ==
- Districts of Malaysia
