= Juasseh =

Juasseh Joseh (Negeri Sembilan Malay)
- Mukim
- Location of Juasseh Juasseh (Peninsular Malaysia) Juasseh (Malaysia)
- Coordinates: 2°47′N 102°18′E
- Country: Malaysia
- State: Negeri Sembilan
- District: Kuala Pilah
- Luak: Jempol
- Time zone: UTC+8 (MYT)
- Postal code: 72500

Juasseh (Negeri Sembilan Malay: Joseh) is a mukim in Kuala Pilah District, Negeri Sembilan, Malaysia. The Sekolah Menengah Vokasional Juasseh (Juasseh Vocational Secondary School) is situated nearby. This town also had a railway station but has since been abandoned.

The historically significant Muar River also flows through Juasseh.

Juasseh in Kuala Pilah District
