= Negeri Sembilan Malay =

Austronesian language

- Bahasa Melayu Negeri Sembilan بهاس ملايو نݢري سمبيلن
- Baso Nogoghi
- Pronunciation: [basɔ nɔgɔɣi]
- Native to: Malaysia
- Region: Negeri Sembilan, southeastern Selangor (Hulu Langat District), northern Malacca (Alor Gajah and Jasin Districts) and northern Johor (Segamat District)
- Native speakers: 508,000 (ethnic population) (2004)
- Language family: Austronesian: Malayo-Polynesian; Malayic; Negeri Sembilan Malay
- Dialects: Kuala Pilah; Jelebu

Language codes
- ISO 639-3: zmi
- Glottolog: nege1240

Negeri Sembilan Malay (Baso Nogoghi or Baso Nismilan; Malay: Bahasa Melayu Negeri Sembilan; Jawi: بهاس ملايو نڬري سمبيلن) is an Austronesian language spoken mainly in the Malaysian state of Negeri Sembilan, including parts of Hulu Langat District in southeastern Selangor, Alor Gajah and parts of Jasin District in northern Malacca, and parts of Segamat District in the northernmost part of Johor. The language is spoken by the descendants of Minangkabau settlers from Sumatra, who have migrated to Negeri Sembilan since as early as the 14th century. It is often considered a variant or dialect of the Minangkabau language; lexical and phonological studies, however, indicate that it is more closely related to Standard Malay than it is to Minangkabau.

== History ==
The Minangkabau people began migrating from the Sumatra highlands to the Malay Peninsula in the 14th century. Migration skyrocketed from the 15th century to the 16th century. At that time, trade activity through the Strait of Malacca increased and many migrants were granted protection by the Malacca Sultanate. From the ports of Malacca, groups and groups of Minangkabau settlers started venturing inland. This was the first migration wave of Minangkabau people to Malacca. Most of the Minangkabau migrants were from Luhak Tanah Datar and Luhak Lima Puluh Kota. This first wave of migration resulted in the opening of a new mukim.

The number of inhabitants inland started increasing due to the rise of migrants and those migrants developed into their own groups of communities. These groups resulted in the creation of 12 clans (suku) as a whole. Different from in Sumatra, the naming of the clans were done based on the origin of the migrants. Migrants from Lima Puluh Kota formed the clans:

- Payakumbuh (Payo Kumbuh/Payokumbuah)
- Batu Hampar (Tompa)
- Mungkal (Mungka)
- Seri Melenggang (Somolenggang/Simalanggang)
- Seri Lemak (Solomak/Sarilamak)
- Tiga Nenek (Tigo Nenek/Tigo Niniak)
- Batu Belang (Batu Bolang)
- Tiga Batu (Tigo Batu/Tigo Batua Situjuah)

Meanwhile, the migrants from Tanah Datar formed the Tanah Datar clan. These migrants also formed three other clans which resulted from intermarriages with communities already settled where the aforementioned Tanah Datar migrants migrated to. These clans were:

- Anak Acheh
- Anak Melaka (Anak Melako)
- Biduanda (Biduando/Dondo)

The Biduanda clan were seen as the leader of the clans that were present because they formed as a result of the intermingling between the Minangkabau people and the Orang Asli, the native people of the Malay Peninsula.

The opening of new mukims inland resulted in the formation of nine nagaris – also known as luaks – that were governed by Penghulus. The nagaris were:

- Jelebu
- Kelang
- Johol
- Rembau
- Sungai Ujong
- Jelai (also known as Ineh)
- Naning
- Segamat
- Pasir Besar

These nine nagaris later formed a confederation that was called the Board of Negeri Sembilan (Malay: Lembaga Negeri Sembilan). This confederation was under the protection of the Johor Sultanate.

In the 18th century, the Johor Sultanate received several attacks and was in an unpeaceful state. During this period, Negeri Sembilan was under the Bugis, insofar as the Datuks of Negeri Sembilan cooperated to make a request to the Sultan of Johor (Abdul Jalil Shah IV) to invite a king from Pagaruyung to make him the leader, a request which was accepted. The invitation of the king (Raja Melewar) brought along the second migration wave of Minangkabau people and resulted in the formation of the state of Negeri Sembilan with the Yamtuan Besar as its leader and Adat Perpatih as its law.

The two migration waves of Minangkabau people and the assimilation of the Minangkabau language to those of the natives resulted in the formation of Negeri Sembilan Malay. This Malay variety later diverged by the influence of English as an administrative language of the Federated Malay States which Negeri Sembilan became a part of whereas the Minangkabau homeland became a part of the Dutch's Sumatra's Westkust itself bringing Dutch into those people's vernacular. Further incorporation of modern Malaysian and Indonesian variants by the two modern nation-states continues the trend. The Minangkabau people of Negeri Sembilan have been separated from the Minangkabau people of Sumatra for 500–600 years. This resulted in Negeri Sembilan Malay developing its own unique features.

== Dialects ==
There are two main dialects of Negeri Sembilan Malay, the southern Kuala Pilah dialect which is spoken in the districts of Kuala Pilah, Seremban, Rembau, Port Dickson, and Tampin, and the northern Jelebu dialect which is spoken in the district of Jelebu, including Lenggeng in Seremban.

== Phonology ==
=== Consonants ===
Negeri Sembilan Malay contains 19 consonants.

		Labial	Denti-alv./ Alveolar	Post-alv./ Palatal	Velar	Glottal
Nasal		m	n	ɲ	ŋ	
Plosive/ Affricate	voiceless	p	t	t͡ʃ	k	ʔ
Plosive/ Affricate	voiced	b	d	d͡ʒ	ɡ	
Fricative	voiceless		s			h
Fricative	voiced				ɣ	
Approximant			l	j	w	

Notes:

- Prevocalic and intervocalic /r/ in Standard Malay corresponds to /ɣ/ in Negeri Sembilan Malay.

=== Vowels ===
==== Monophthongs ====
Negeri Sembilan Malay contains seven monophthongs, /i, e, ɛ, a, u, o, ɔ/ with two being not phonemic in Standard Malay (/ɛ, ɔ/) and the schwa /ə/ being absent except in the Jelebu dialect.

	Front	Central	Back
Close	i		u
Close-Mid	e		o
Mid		(ə)	
Open-Mid	ɛ		ɔ
Open		a	

==== Diphthongs ====
Negeri Sembilan Malay contains three diphthongs, /aj, aw, uj/. The Jelebu dialect contains an extra diphthong /oj/ which corresponds to Standard Malay /ul/.

=== Correspondence with Standard Malay ===
Below is a chart showing sound correspondences between Standard Malay and Negeri Sembilan Malay.

Standard Malay Sound	Negeri Sembilan Malay Correspondence	Example (Standard Malay ≙ Negeri Sembilan Malay)		
/ə/	/ɔ/ (Kuala Pilah) /ə/ (Jelebu)	tebal /təbal/ 'thick'	≙	/tɔba/ (Kuala PIlah) /təba/ (Jelebu)
/-ir/	/-e/	bibir /bibir/ 'lip'	≙	/bibe/
/-il/	/-e/	katil /katil/ 'bed'	≙	/kate/
/-is/	/-ih/	habis /habis/ 'finished'	≙	/abih/
/-ur/	/-o/	tegur /təɡur/ 'to greet'	≙	/tɔɡo/ (Kuala Pilah) /təɡo/ (Jelebu)
/-ul/	/-o/	bendul /bəndul/ 'threshold'	≙	/bɔndo/ (Kuala Pilah)
/-ul/	/-oj/ (Jelebu)	bendul /bəndul/ 'threshold'	≙	/bəndoj/ (Jelebu)
/-us/	/-ujh/	kabus /kabus/ 'fog'	≙	/kabujh/
/-a/	/-ɔ/	nama /nama/ 'name'	≙	/namɔ/
/-ar/	/-a/	ular /ular/ 'snake'	≙	/ula/
/-al/	/-a/	bantal /bantal/ 'pillow'	≙	/banta/
/-as/	/-ɛh/	balas /balas/ 'to respond'	≙	/balɛh/
/-at/	/-ɛʔ/ (Kuala Pilah) /-at/ (Jelebu)	tempat /təmpat/ 'place'	≙	/tɔmpɛʔ/ (Kuala Pilah) /təmpat/ (Jelebu)
/e/	/ɛ/	leper /leper/ 'flat'	≙	/lɛpɛ/
/-er/	/ɛ/	leper /leper/ 'flat'	≙	/lɛpɛ/
/-or/	/-ɔ/	kotor /kotor/ 'dirty'	≙	/kotɔ/
/-a.hi/	/-a.i/	dahi /da.hi/ 'forehead'	≙	/da.i/
/-a.hu/	/-a.u/	bahu /ba.hu/ 'shoulder'	≙	/ba.u/
/h-/	/∅-/ (Kuala Pilah) /h-/ (Jelebu)	hijau /hid͡ʒaw/ 'green'	≙	/id͡ʒaw/ (Kuala Pilah) /hid͡ʒaw/ (Jelebu)

== Vocabulary ==
According to Reniwati (2012), Negeri Sembilan Malay has a lexical similarity of 94.74% with Standard Malay and a lexical similarity of 83.16% with Minangkabau.

Vocabulary Comparison
	Standard Malay	Minangkabau (Standard)	Negeri Sembilan Malay (with English meaning)
1	Semua	Sado	Somuwo/Sumo (all)
2	Abu	Abu	Abu (ash)
3	Kulit Kayu	Kulik Kayu	Kulet Pokok (tree bark)
4	Perut	Paruik	Poghut (stomach)
5	Besar	Gadang/Basa	Godang/Bosa (big)
6	Burung	Buruang	Bughong (bird)
7	Gigit	Gigik	Giget (bite)
8	Hitam	Itam	Itam (black)
9	Darah	Darah	Daghah (blood)
10	Tulang	Tulang	Tulang (bone)
11	Tetek/Susu	Susu	Susu (milk)
12	Bakar	Baka	Baka/Bako (burn)
13	Kuku	Kuku	Kuku
14	Awan	Awan	Awan (cloud)
15	Sejuk/Dingin	Sajuak/Dingin	Sojuk (cold)
16	Datang	Datang/Tibo	Datang/Tibo (arrive)
17	Mati	Mati	Mati/Mampuih (die)
18	Anjing	Anjiang	Anjeng (dog)
19	Minum	Minum	Minom/Minam (drink)
20	Kering	Kariang	Koghing (dry)
21	Telinga	Talingo	Tolingo (ear)
22	Tanah	Tanah	Tanah (ground)
23	Makan	Makan	Makan (eat)
24	Telur	Talua	Tolo (egg)
25	Mata	Mato	Mato (eye)
26	Lemak/Gemuk	Gomok	Gomuk (fat)
27	Bulu	Bulu	Bulu (feather)
28	Api	Api	Api (fire)
29	Ikan	Lauak/Ikan	Ikan (fish)
30	Terbang	Tabang	Toghobang (to fly)
31	Penuh	Panuah	Ponuh (full)
32	Kaki	Kaki	Kaki (foot)
33	Beri	Agiah/Bari	Boghi/momboghi (give smth)
34	Baik	Elok/Baiak	Elok/Baek/baguih (good)
35	Hijau	Ijau	Ijau (green)
36	Rambut	Rambuik	Ghambut (hair)
37	Tangan	Tangan	Tangan (hand)
38	Kepala	Kapalo	Kopalo/Palo (head)
39	Dengar	Danga	Donga (listen, hear)
40	Jantung	Jantuang	Jantong (heart)
41	Tanduk	Tanduak	Tandok
42	Aku/Saya	Aden/Ambo/Awak	Ese/Ayo/Eden/Sey (I)
43	Bunuh	Bunuah	Bunoh (kill)
44	Lutut	Lutuik	Lutut
45	Tahu	Tau	Tau (know)
46	Daun	Daun	Daun/Daon (leaf)
47	Baring	Golek	Bagheng
48	Hati	Ati	Ati (heart)
49	Panjang	Panjang	Panjang (long)
50	Kutu	Kutu	Kutu (flea)
51	Lelaki	Laki-laki	Lolaki (boy)
52	Banyak	Banyak	Banyak (many)
53	Daging	Dagiang	Dageng (meat)
54	Bulan	Bulan	Bulan (moon)
55	Gunung	Gunuang	Gunong (mountain)
56	Mulut	Muncuang	Mulot (mouth)
57	Nama	Namo	Namo (name)
58	Leher	Lihia	Lehe (neck)
59	Baru/Baharu	Baru	Baghu (new)
60	Malam	Malam	Malam (night)
61	Hidung	Iduang	Idung (nose)
62	Tidak	Indak/ndak	Tidak/tak (no)
63	Satu	Ciek	Satu (one)
64	Orang	Urang	Ughang (person)
65	Hujan	Ujan	Ujan (rain)
66	Merah	Sirah	Meghah (red)
67	Jalan	Jalan	Jalan (road)
68	Urat	Urek	Ughek
69	Bulat	Bulek	Bulek (round, circle)
70	Pasir	Pasia/Kasiak	Pase (sand)
71	Sebut/Cakap	Sabuik	Sobut (Speak)
72	Lihat	Liek	Nengok (look)
73	Biji	Incek	Biji (seed)
74	Duduk	Duduak	Dudok (sit)
75	Kulit	Kulik/Jangek	Kulet (skin)
76	Tidur	Lalok	Tido/Lolap (sleep)
77	Asap	Asok	Asap (smoke)
78	Diri	Tagak	Togak (stand)
79	Bintang	Bintang	Bintang (star)
80	Kecil	Ketek/Kaciak	Kocik (small)
81	Batu	Batu	Batu (stone)
82	Matahari	Matoari	Matohaghi (sun)
83	Ekor	Ikua	Eko (tail)
84	{be-}renang	{ba-}ranang	{bo-}ghonang (to swim)
85	Itu	Itu	Itu (it)
86	Ini	Iko	Ini (this)
87	Kamu/Awak/Engkau/Kau	Awak/Sanak/Kau(perempuan)/Ang(laki-laki)	Awak/Ekau (you)
88	Lidah	Lidah	Lidah (tongue)
89	Gigi	Gigi	Gigi (tooth)
90	Pohon/Pokok	Batang Pohon	Pokok (tree)
91	Dua	Duo	Duo (two)
92	{ber-}jalan	{ba-}jalan	{bo-}jalan (to go)
93	hangat/panas	Angek	Paneh (hot)
94	Air	Aia	Ae (water)
95	Kami	Awak/Kami	Kami/Kito/Kitoghang (we)
96	Apa	A/Apo	Apo/Mondo (what)
97	Putih	Putiah	Puteh (white)
98	Siapa	Sia/Siapo	Siapo/Sapo (who)
99	Perempuan	Padusi	Poghompuan (girl)
100	Kuning	Kuniang	Kuning (yellow)
101	Saudara	Dunsanak	Waghih (brother, fellow)
102	Hari	Ari	Aghi (day)
103	Jatuh	Balambin	Bodobin/Tosombam (fall)
104	Bagaimana	Bak Apo/Ba'a/Bak Mano	Camno (how)
105	Pemalas	Panyagan	Penyogan/Pomaleh (lazy person)
106	Mari	Mari	Maghi (come)
