= Astana Raja =

Astana Raja Stanoghajo (Negeri Sembilan Malay)
- Village
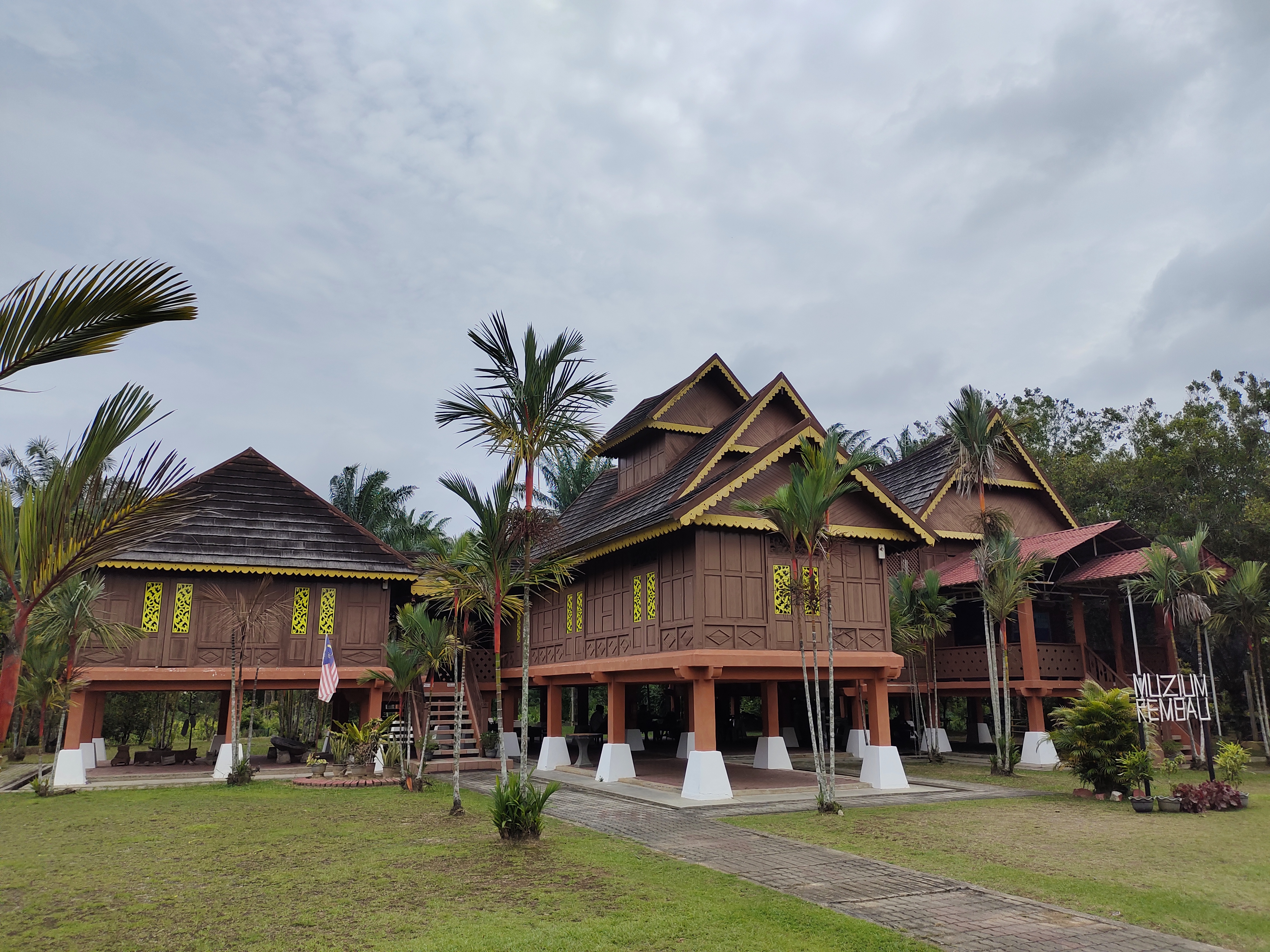
- Rembau Museum, a replica of Raja Melewar's palace

- Location of Astana Raja in Malaysia
- Coordinates: 2°30′25″N 102°07′02″E
- Country: Malaysia
- State: Negeri Sembilan
- District: Rembau
- Luak: Rembau

Government
  - Type: Local government
  - Body: Rembau District Council
  - President: Mohd Zamri Mohd Esa
  - MP: Mohamad Hasan (BN–UMNO)
  - MLA: Suhaimi Aini (BN–UMNO)
- Time zone: UTC+8 (MST)
- Postcode: 71350

Astana Raja (lit. 'king's palace', Negeri Sembilan Malay: Stanoghajo), sometimes spelled as Istana Raja, is a village in Rembau District, Negeri Sembilan, Malaysia. It is located on the eastern bank of the Rembau River, the largest affluent of the Linggi River.

Astana Raja is situated 9.6 kilometres (6.0 mi) southeast of Rembau.

== History ==
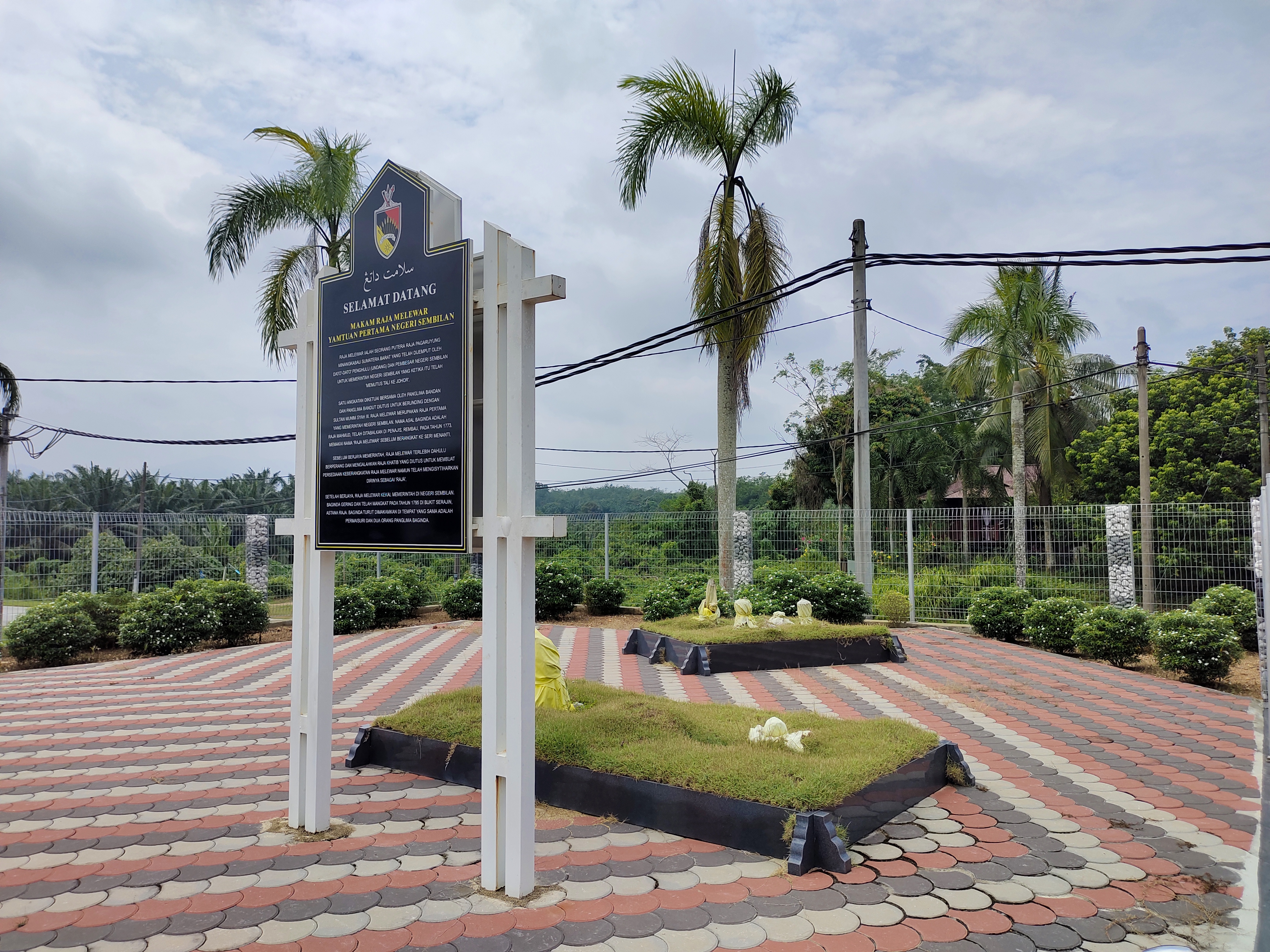
Tomb of Raja Melewar, Astana Raja

Astana Raja is a village that holds a significant historical value. It was the first residence of Raja Melewar, the first Yamtuan Besar of Negeri Sembilan, where he lived temporarily after being installed in Kampung Penajis which is a mere 1 kilometre (0.62 mi) to its north. Furthermore, he was also laid to rest in Astana Raja following his death in 1795. Nowadays, the Rembau Museum, which is a replica of Raja Melewar's palace dedicated to the monarch's history, has been built as a tourist attraction.

Postville Express, a World War II- era United States Army Air Forces (USAAF) B-29 Superfortress carrying an 11-man crew, reportedly crashed near Astana Raja on 11 January 1945 while on a return flight to Kharagpur Air Base, India after a successful bombing mission on the Japanese-occupied Singapore Naval Base during Operation Matterhorn. The bomber, bearing the serial number 42-24704 and a participant of the XX Bomber Command, crashed into the jungle below after being shot down by a Japanese Ki-61 fighter plane. The incident rendered three crew members killed, with eight others surviving. Half of the crew members who survived the crash were later taken prisoner by the Japanese, while the rest evaded capture as local residents came to their rescue. The crash predates the more well-known RAF B-24 Liberator Snake, which went down into the dense jungles near Mount Telapak Buruk 7 months later.

== Transportation ==
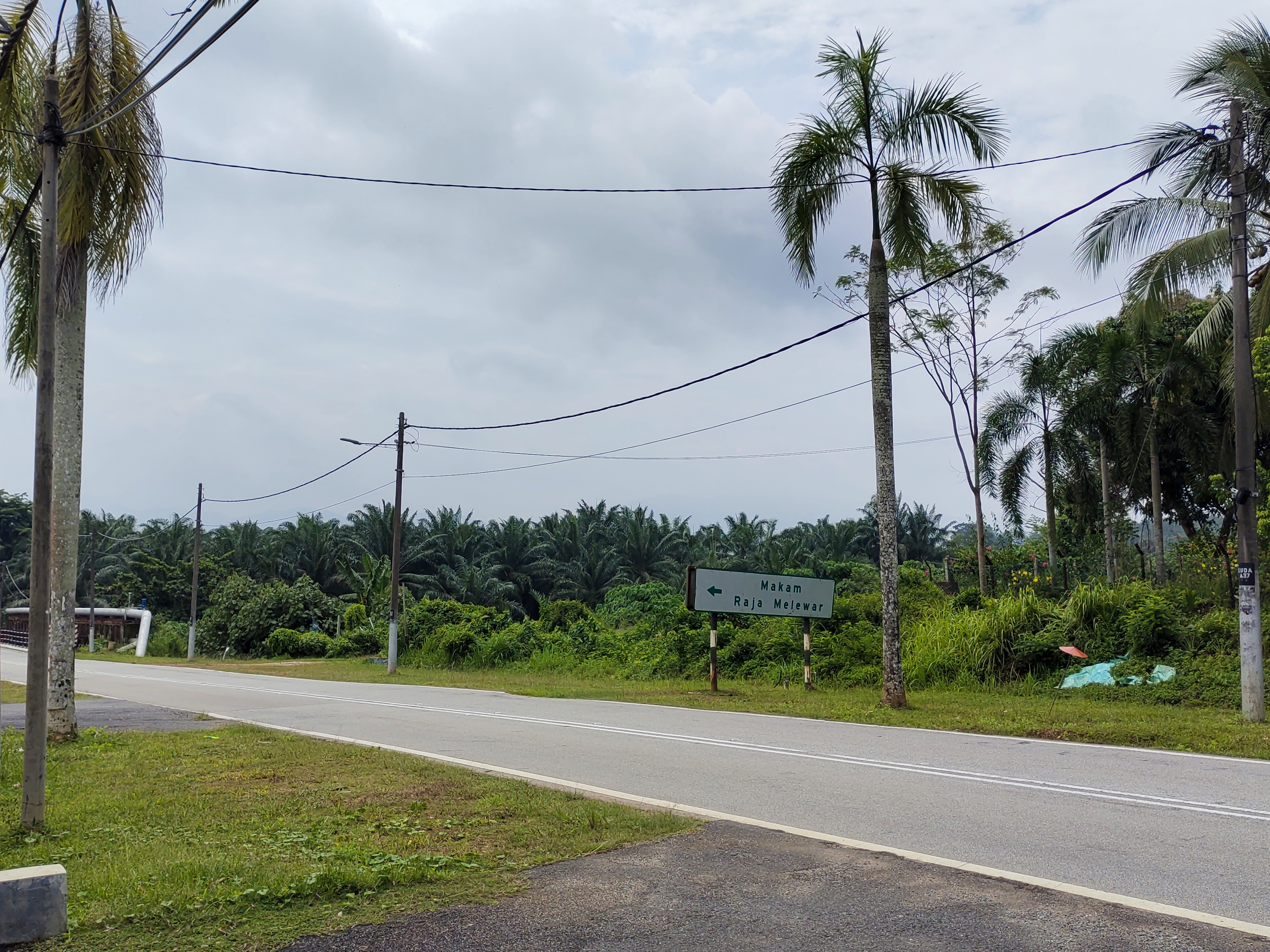
State Route N12

Astana Raja is situated at the intersection between State Routes N11, N12 and N106. N11 connects the village to Chengkau, Rembau and eventually Seremban to its north, N12 links it with Kota in the east and Lubuk China on the state border with Malacca in the west, and N106 acts as an alternative route to Kota and eventually lead to Tampin in the south.
