= Mount Tampin =

Mountain in Tampin, Negeri Sembilan, Malaysia

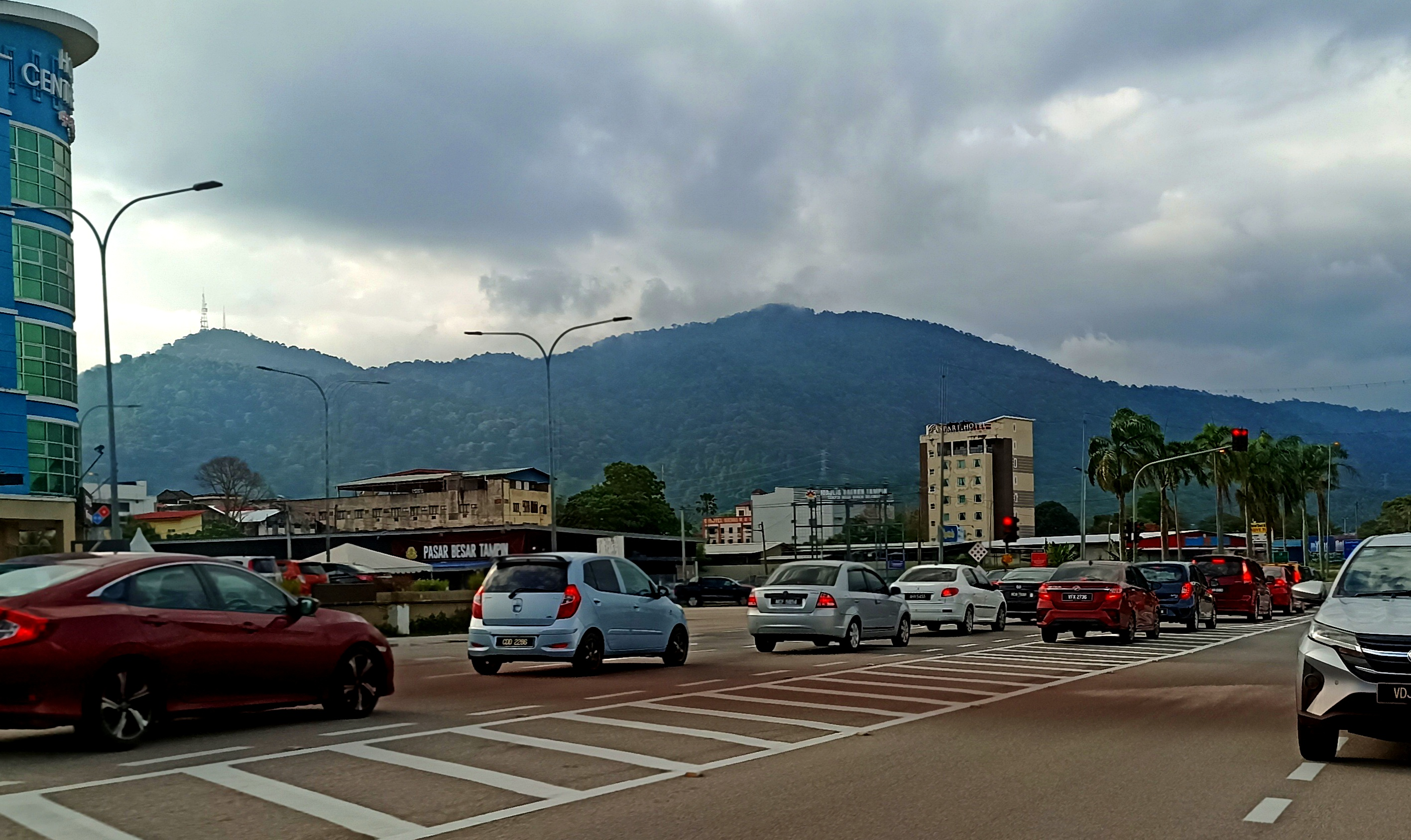
- Mount Tampin dominating the namesake town's skyline, viewed towards north

Highest point
- Elevation: 764 m (2,507 ft)
- Coordinates: 2°30′31″N 102°12′42″E

Naming
- Native name: Gunung Tampin (Malay)

Geography
- Location within Malaysia
- Location: Tampin District, Negeri Sembilan
- Parent range: Titiwangsa Mountains

Climbing
- Easiest route: Hiking

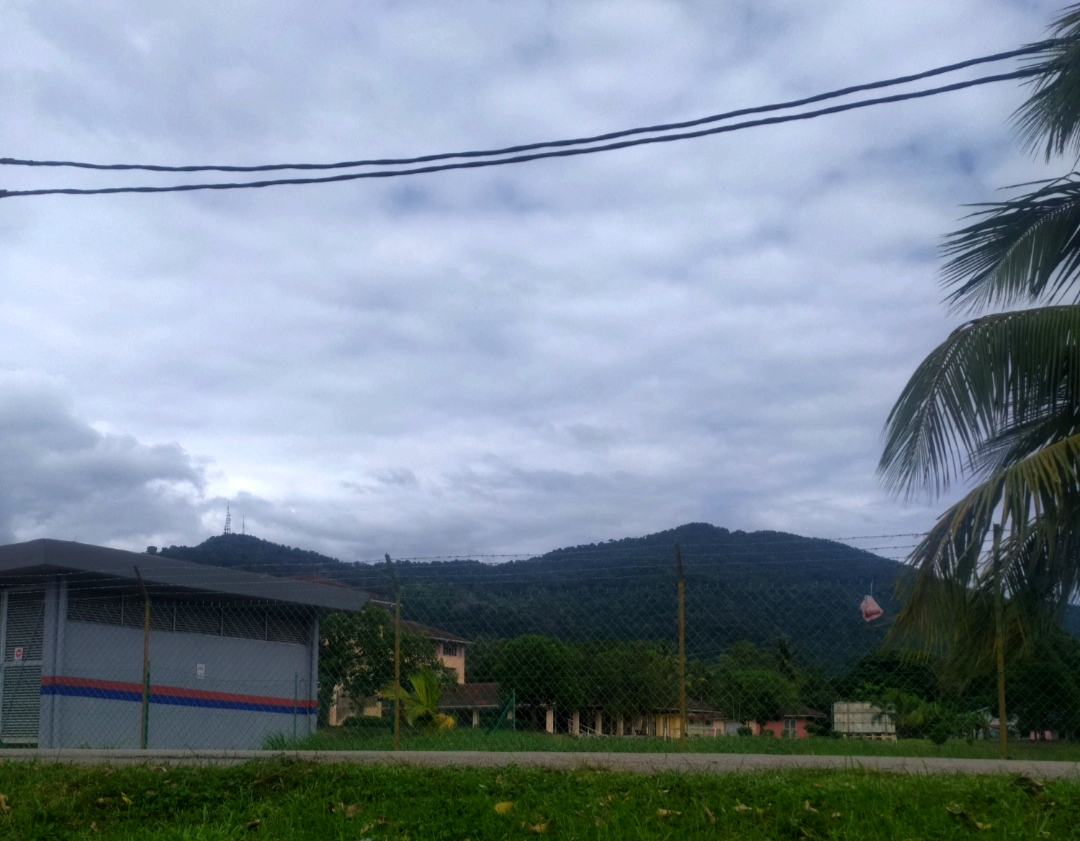
Southeastern aspect. The lower peak to the left is Bukit Tampin (560 m)

Mount Tampin (Malay: Gunung Tampin) is a mountain in Tampin District, Negeri Sembilan, Malaysia, close to the border with Malacca.

It is the Hausberg of the namesake town of Tampin, which also serve as the district capital, as well as Pulau Sebang on the Malaccan side.

== Description ==
A monument off Federal Route 1 marking the geographical southern terminus of the Titiwangsa Mountains.

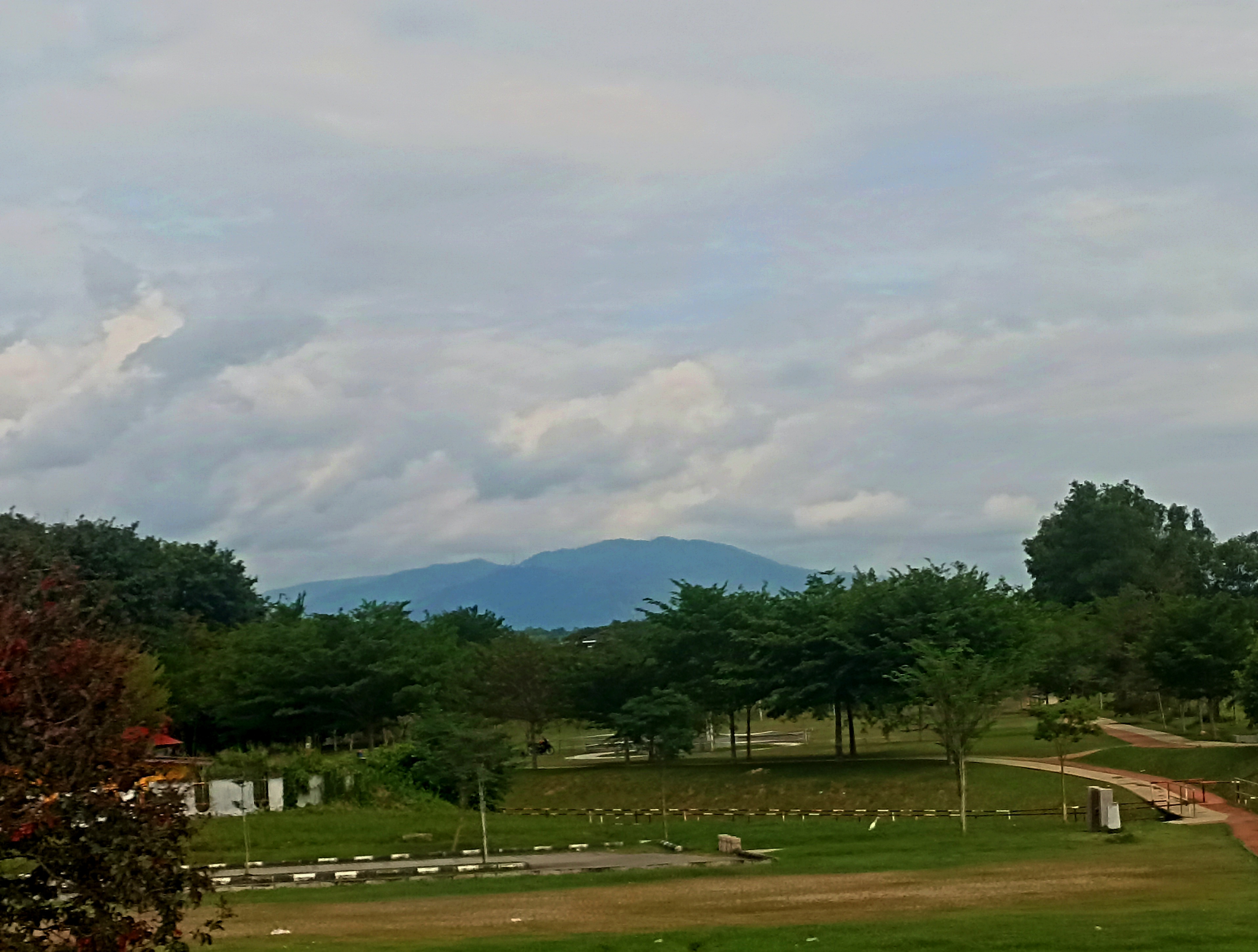
The mountain as seen from Alor Gajah, Malacca.

By geographical definition, Mount Tampin stands at the southern end of the Titiwangsa Mountains, the longest and most contiguous mountain range in Malaysia and part of the Tenasserim Hills. Being a twin-peaked mountain, it consists of the main peak (North Tampin Peak), measuring 764 m (2,507 ft) above sea level; and the lower Tampin Hill, of the height of 560 m (1,837 ft) above sea level, connected by a saddle. The South Tampin Peak, situated just south of North Tampin Peak and north of Tampin Hill, is 733 m (2,405 ft) above sea level. Tampin Hill (Malay: Bukit Tampin) has a complex of telecoms towers on its summit, which caters for listeners and viewers in the neighbouring state of Malacca.

== Tourism and development ==
Owing to its position at the southern tip of the Titiwangsa Mountains, in 2021 the Ministry of Science, Technology and Innovation (MOSTI) has proposed a masterplan of developing an adventure trek that runs along the mountain range. The trek, known as the Titiwangsa Walk of Life, measures around 893 km (555 mi) long, running along the mountain range's northwest–southeast orientation, starting from Tampin in the south running up north to Jeli, Kelantan. The proposed project fared positive reactions, as it is poised to catalyse the nation's eco-tourism sector.

Mount Tampin is one of Negeri Sembilan's hiking hotspots. It is the southern starting point of the Trans-Naning Trail, a 21 km (13 mi) hiking trail encompassing the last seven peaks along the Titiwangsa Mountains, ending at Mount Datuk at the north. The trail was first opened around December 2015. As of 2022, the trail has seen around 436 hikers, including 20 from seven countries: Australia, Germany, India, Japan, Singapore, South Korea and Thailand, in conjunction to the three-day Trans-Naning Ultra NS challenge, which was officially launched by the Menteri Besar of Negeri Sembilan, Aminuddin Harun. In addition, according to him, the challenge will be held biannually. This will be one of the state's sports tourism products and is in line with the state government's efforts to develop the southern terminus of the backbone of Peninsular Malaysia.

== Amenities ==
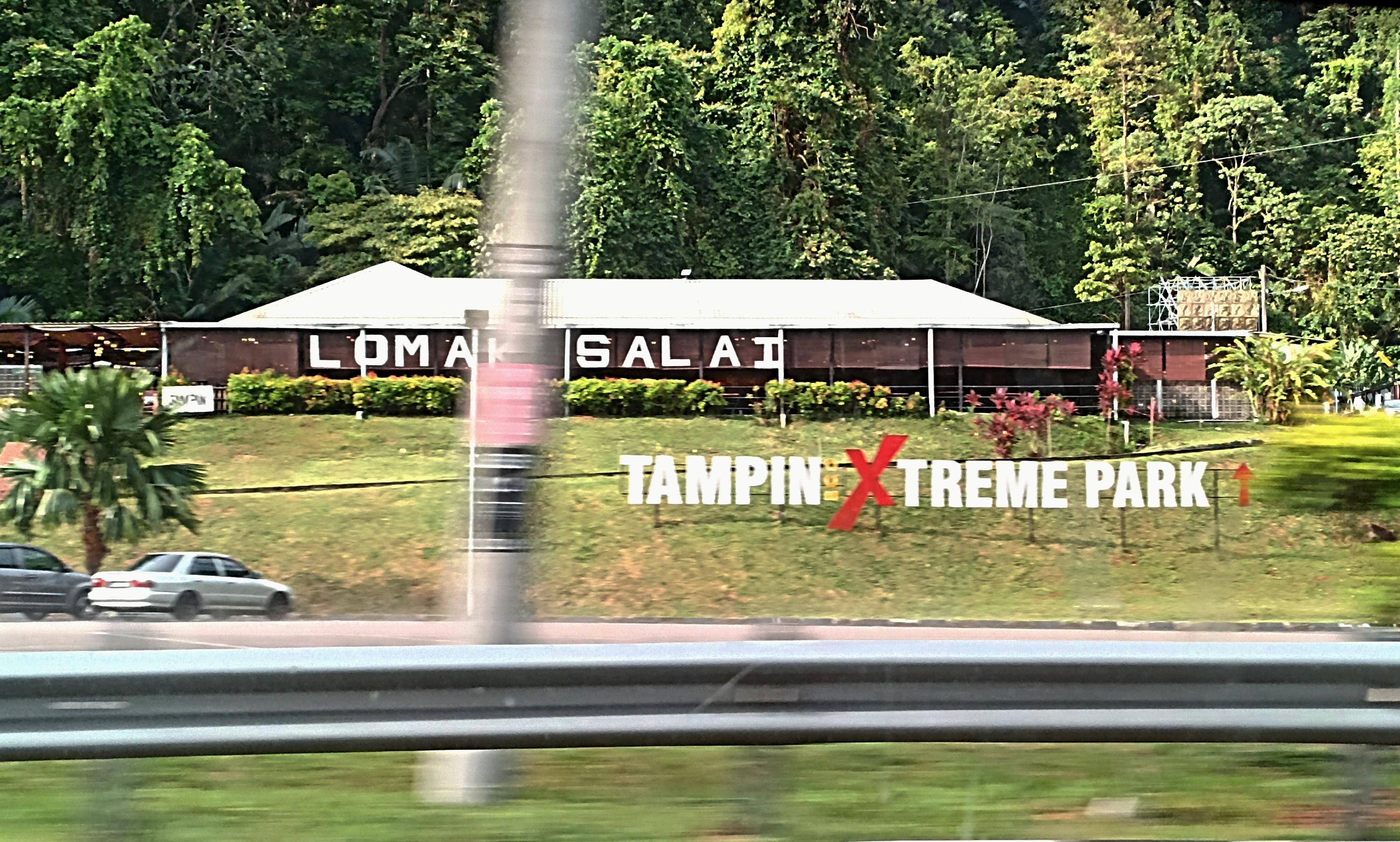
Tampin Layby

=== Tampin Layby ===
Sitting at the western base of Mount Tampin and next to Federal Route FT 1 is a layby with an R&R concept. Food stalls offering Negri cuisine, surau and children's playground are among the facilities provided at the layby. Motorists who are using FT 1 can have a stop to rest and having some refreshments before continuing their journey.

=== Tampin Xtreme Park ===
The Tampin Xtreme Park is just located behind the layby. A haven for extreme sports aficionados, the park offers a variety of strenuous yet enjoyable outdoor sports such as rock climbing, tree climbing, flying fox, waterfall abseiling, etc. The park covers a total land area of 0.81 ha (8,100 sq m).

=== Tampin Water Park ===
Located at the southern toe of the mountain are the Tampin Water Park and the southern gateway to the Trans-Naning trailhead. Years prior, the water park used to be a pair of swimming pools. Opened in February 2019, the park consists of four swimming pools of different depths, ranging from 1 ft (0.3 m) to 7 ft (2.1 m) deep. There are also water slides as well. All the pools are filled with treated water pumped from the mountain's aquifer, which adds the uniqueness to the park. Visitors patronizing the water park can not only having a nice splash of cool mountain water on a hot sunny day, but can also take part in other fun activities like paintball, trekking in the lush tropical rainforest, camping, water zumba, archery, etc. Accommodations are also available in the park.

=== Tampin Lake Gardens ===
Located around 400 m from Tampin Layby. A place for recreational activities for the community, the Lake Garden is equipped with facilities like jogging tracks circumambulating the lake, children's playground, lookout tower, huts and benches to sit on whilst enjoying the tranquility and the surrounding greenery.

== Gallery ==
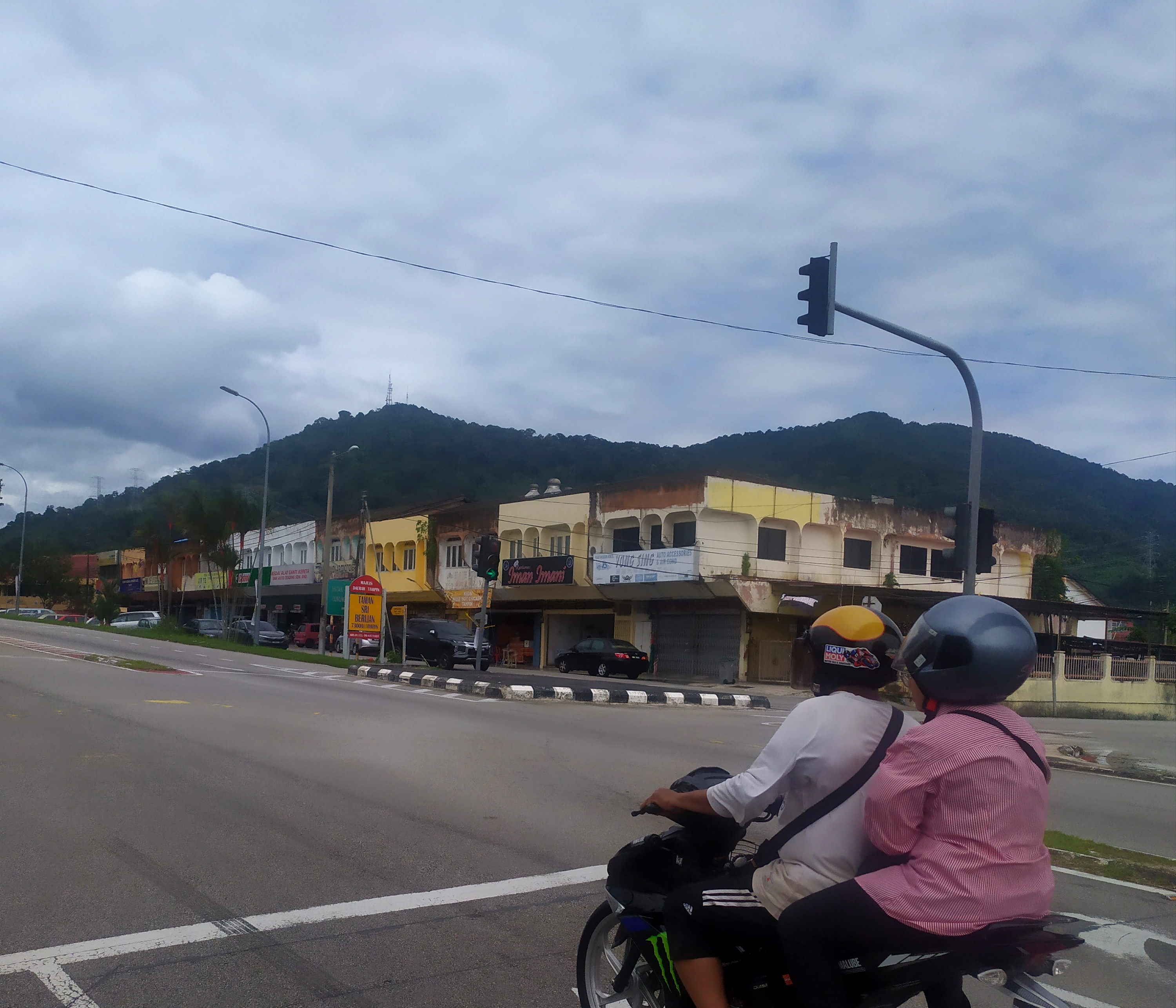
Mount Tampin, the southern end of the Titiwangsa Mountains, seen from Route FT 1 in the northern outskirts of Tampin.

View of the mountain from Pulau Sebang, Malacca.

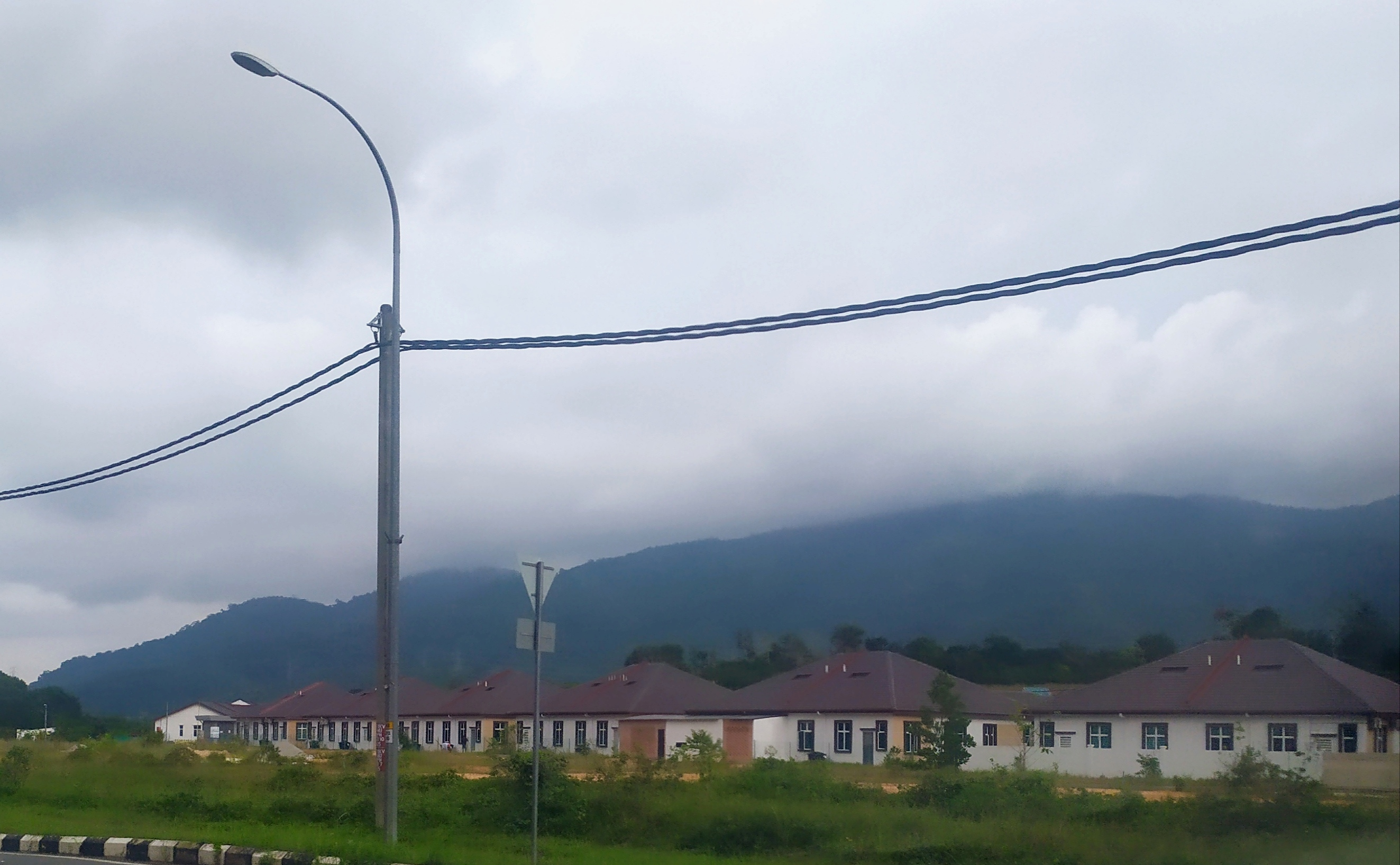
Eastern face, as seen from Repah

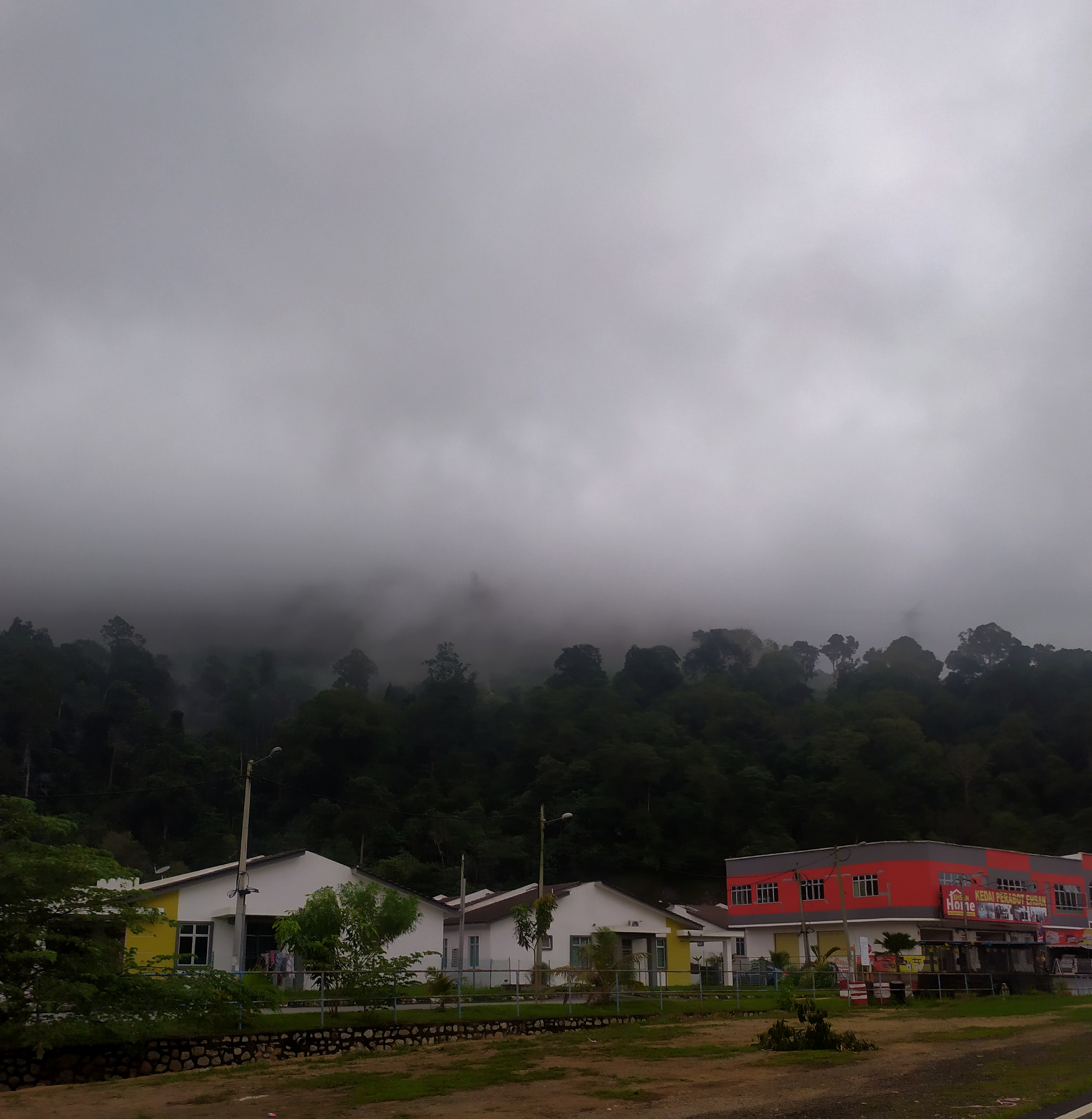
Northwestern face, totally obscured in thick fog.

Bukit Tampin, seen from Kendong, Rembau District, approximately 2 kilometres (1.2 mi) from the Tampin district line.

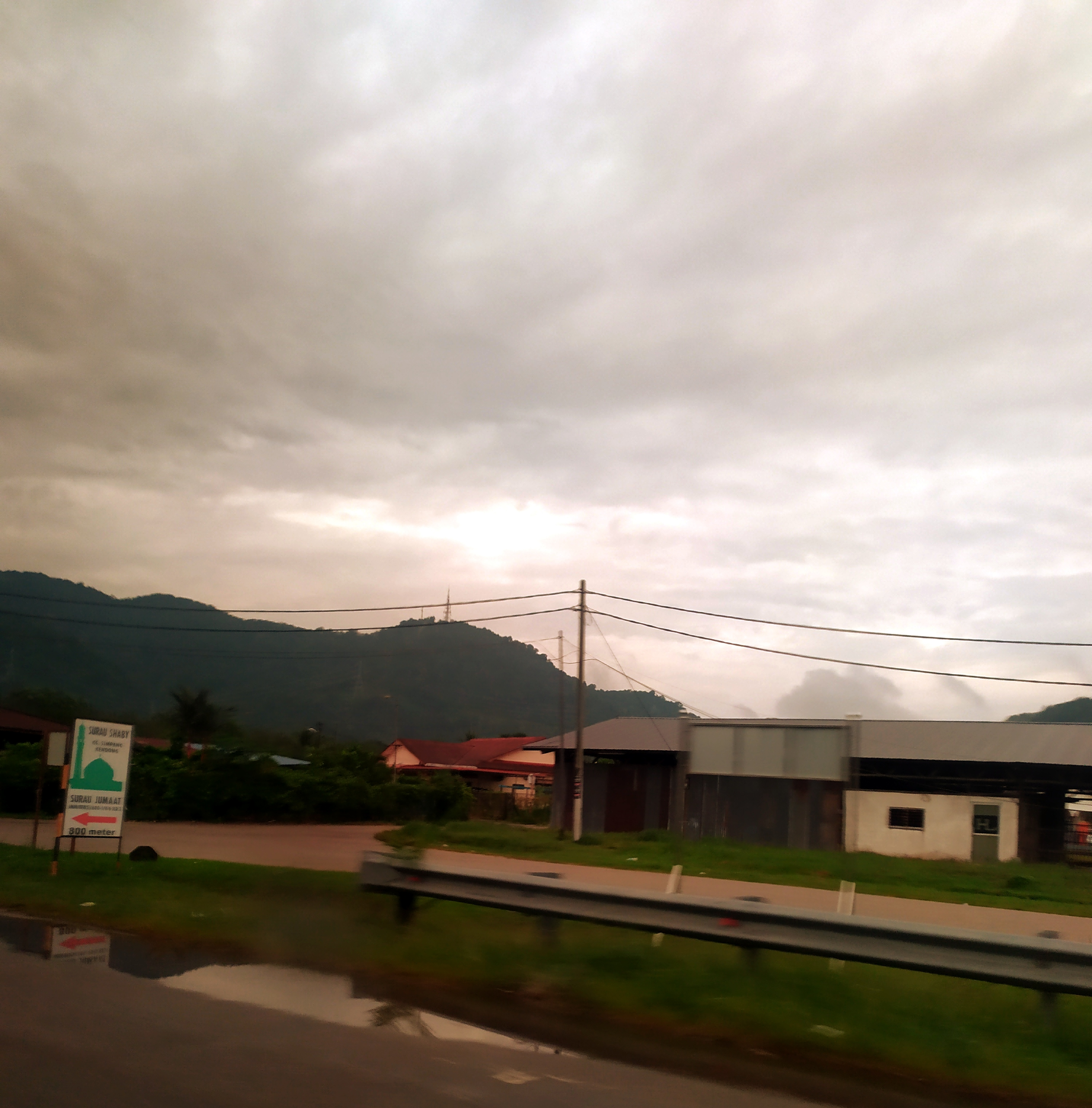
As seen from Taboh Naning, Malacca, from Route FT 19.

The Titiwangsa Mountains, just a few kilometres from Mount Tampin.

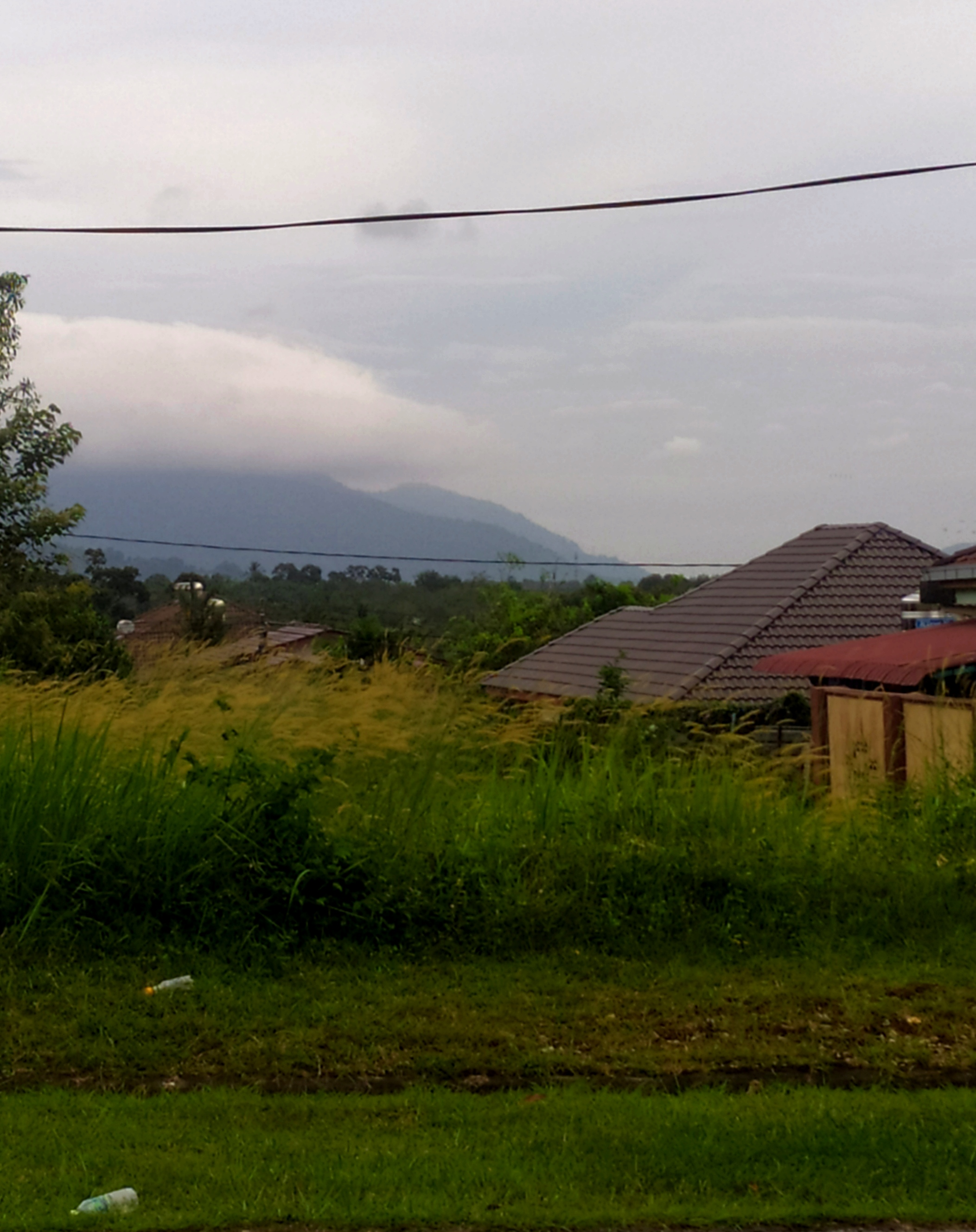
The Titiwangsa Mountains near Rembau, looking south. Mount Tampin is recognizable as the light grey triangular mountain rising behind Mount Datuk (cloud-capped peak in the foreground).

== See also ==
- List of mountains in Malaysia
