= Chengkau =

Mukim in Rembau, Negeri Sembilan, Malaysia

Coordinates: 2°33′N 102°08′E

Chengkau in Rembau District

Chengkau (Negeri Sembilan Malay: Chongkau) is a mukim in Rembau District, Negeri Sembilan, Malaysia.

== History ==
In its early years, Chengkau town was built near the old railway station (the station building still exists) but later was moved near the access road (the Seremban to Tampin road). In the 1980s, half of the town was burned down, and this was later rebuilt with more modern structures.

In 2010, the decision was taken to build a new flyover to cater for the rapid growth of Chengkau, and making way for the electrification and double-tracking works of the Seremban–Gemas section of the KTM West Coast railway line.

== Transportation ==
Chengkau is served by Federal Route 1 that links it with Rembau town, as well as Seremban further north, and with Kota and Tampin to the south. It is also connected to Pulau Mampat and Astana Raja via State Routes N10 and N11, respectively.
