= Mount Datuk =

Mountain in Negeri Sembilan, Malaysia

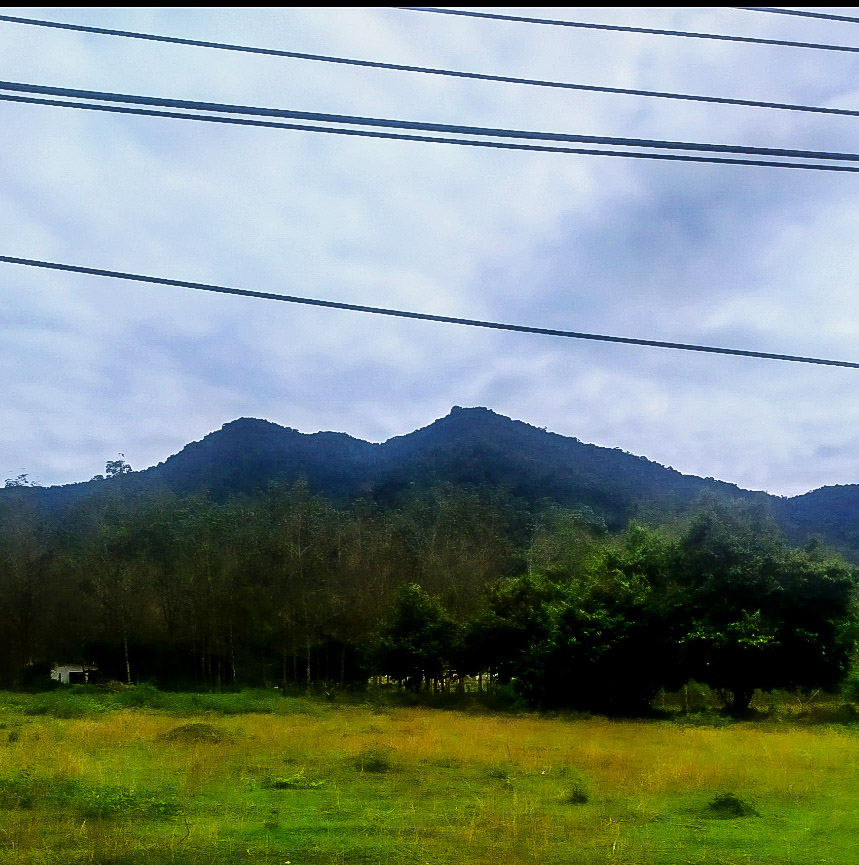
- Western face of Datuk, with its distinctive tor visible as a bulge at the slopes of the south peak.

Highest point
- Elevation: 884 m (2,900 ft)
- Coordinates: 2°33′02.8″N 102°10′58.7″E

Naming
- Native name: Gunung Datuk (Malay)

Geography
- Location within Malaysia
- Location: Rembau and Kuala Pilah Districts, Negeri Sembilan
- Parent range: Titiwangsa Mountains

Climbing
- Easiest route: Hiking via Batang Nyamor (west) or Tampin (south)

Mount Datuk (Malay: Gunung Datuk), also known as Mount Rembau, is a mountain situated on the border between Batang Nyamor, Rembau District and Johol, Kuala Pilah District in the Malaysian state of Negeri Sembilan, in the southern extremity of the Titiwangsa Mountains. At around 884 m (2,900 ft), it is the highest mountain in the district of Rembau.

== Toponymy ==
The mountain gets its name from Datuk Perpatih Nan Sebatang, the creator of the Adat Perpatih, a matrilineal customary law that is widely practiced in the state. According to the information board at the base of the mountain, in 1372, on this very mountain he organized a gathering with other local chieftains to elect a new Lembaga, which is a title of the leader of a suku, where the suku is analogous to a clan. Due to its connection to Datuk Perpatih Nan Sebatang, the mountain also earned the sobriquet Gunung Beradat (lit. 'mountain of customs').

== Description ==
Sitting on the border between the districts of Rembau and Kuala Pilah, Mount Datuk is situated approximately 8 km (5 mi) to the northwest of Mount Tampin, which is the geographical southern tip of the Titiwangsa Mountains. It is the tallest peak in Rembau District, and the sixth tallest in Negeri Sembilan overall, measuring at 884 m above sea level. Mount Angsi, which is 59 m shorter, stands 21 km (13 mi) north of Datuk.

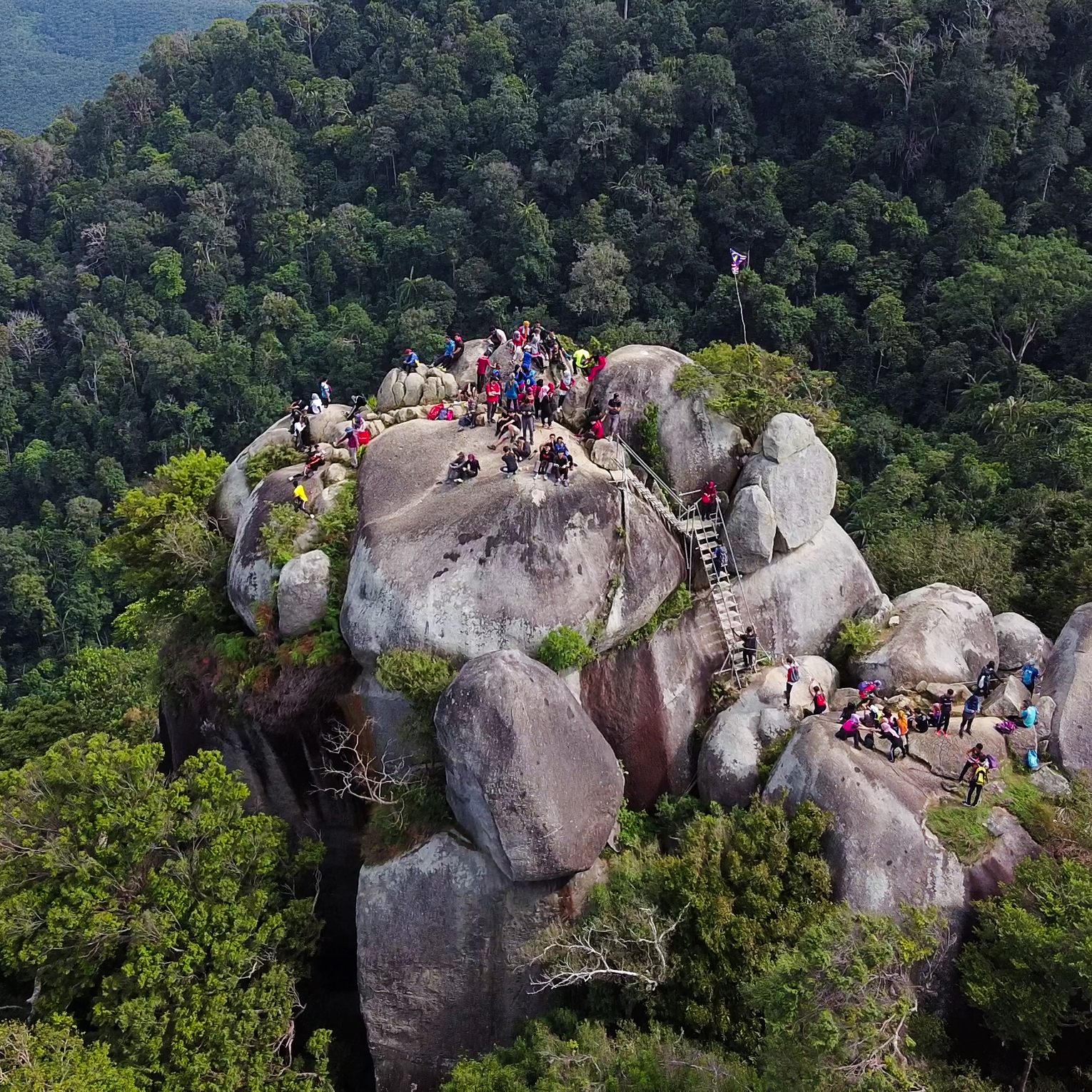
Hikers flocking on the tor, a well defined feature of the mountain.

The main highlight of the mountain is a tor that consists of massive granite boulders, at the elevation of 855 m (2,805 ft).

== Tourism ==
Mount Datuk is one of Negeri Sembilan's popular spots for hiking, especially from within the state itself, the Klang Valley and Malacca. From its trailhead in Batang Nyamor, hikers ascend towards the tor, where they can get to enjoy a 360° panoramic view of the surrounding area of Rembau District. In addition, the Strait of Malacca, as well as Malacca City are also visible from this point, especially on clear and sunny days.

Datuk is also the northern terminus of the Trans-Naning Trail, a 21 km long hiking trail that brings hikers explore the last seven peaks of the Titiwangsa Mountains, which ends in the south at Mount Tampin.

== Gallery ==
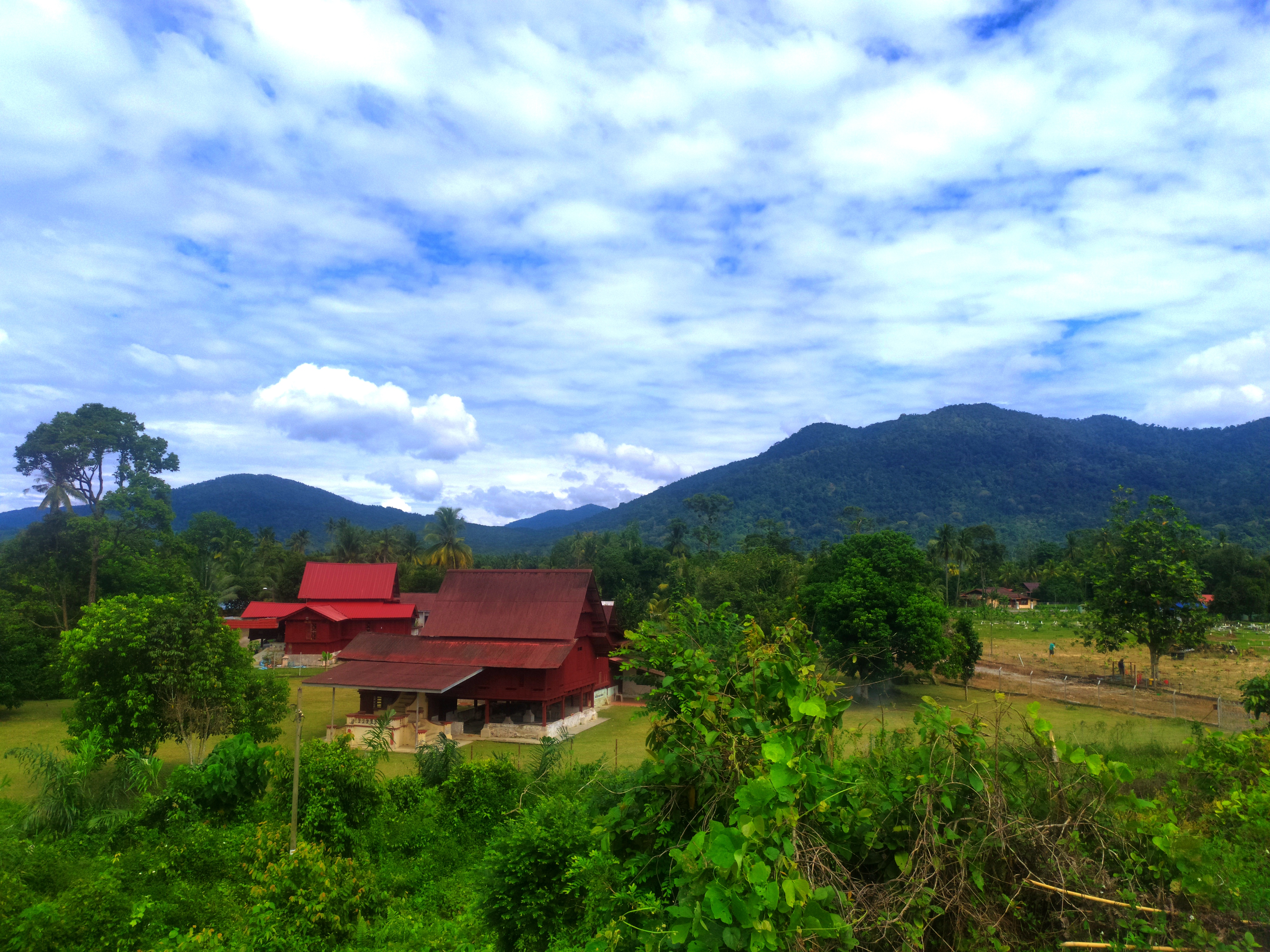
The Negri Titiwangsa near Kampung Gadong, with Datuk rising to the east (right hand side of the image). Viewed towards north.

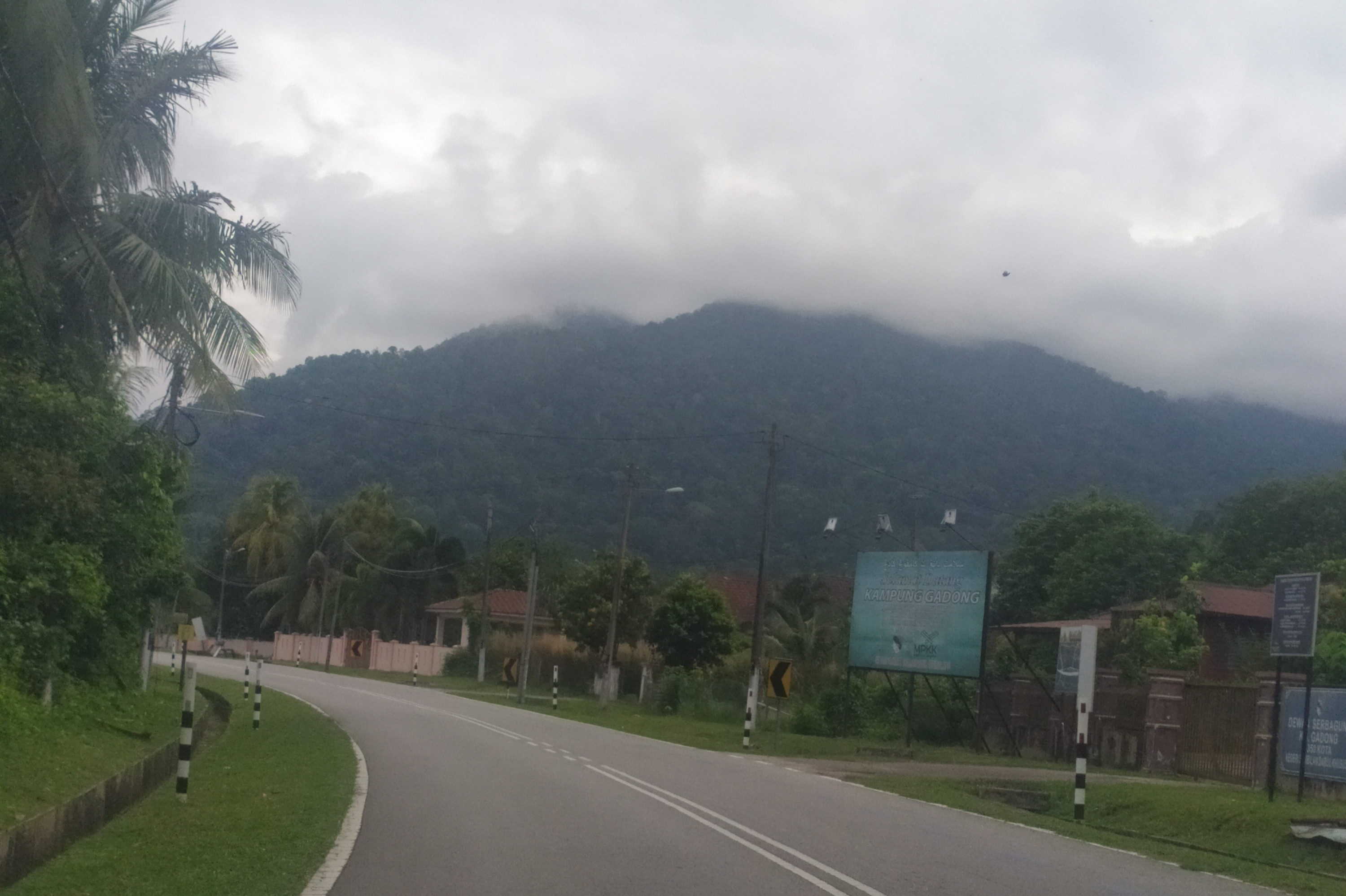
Mount Datuk, seen from Negeri Sembilan State Route N111 northbound to Bongek.

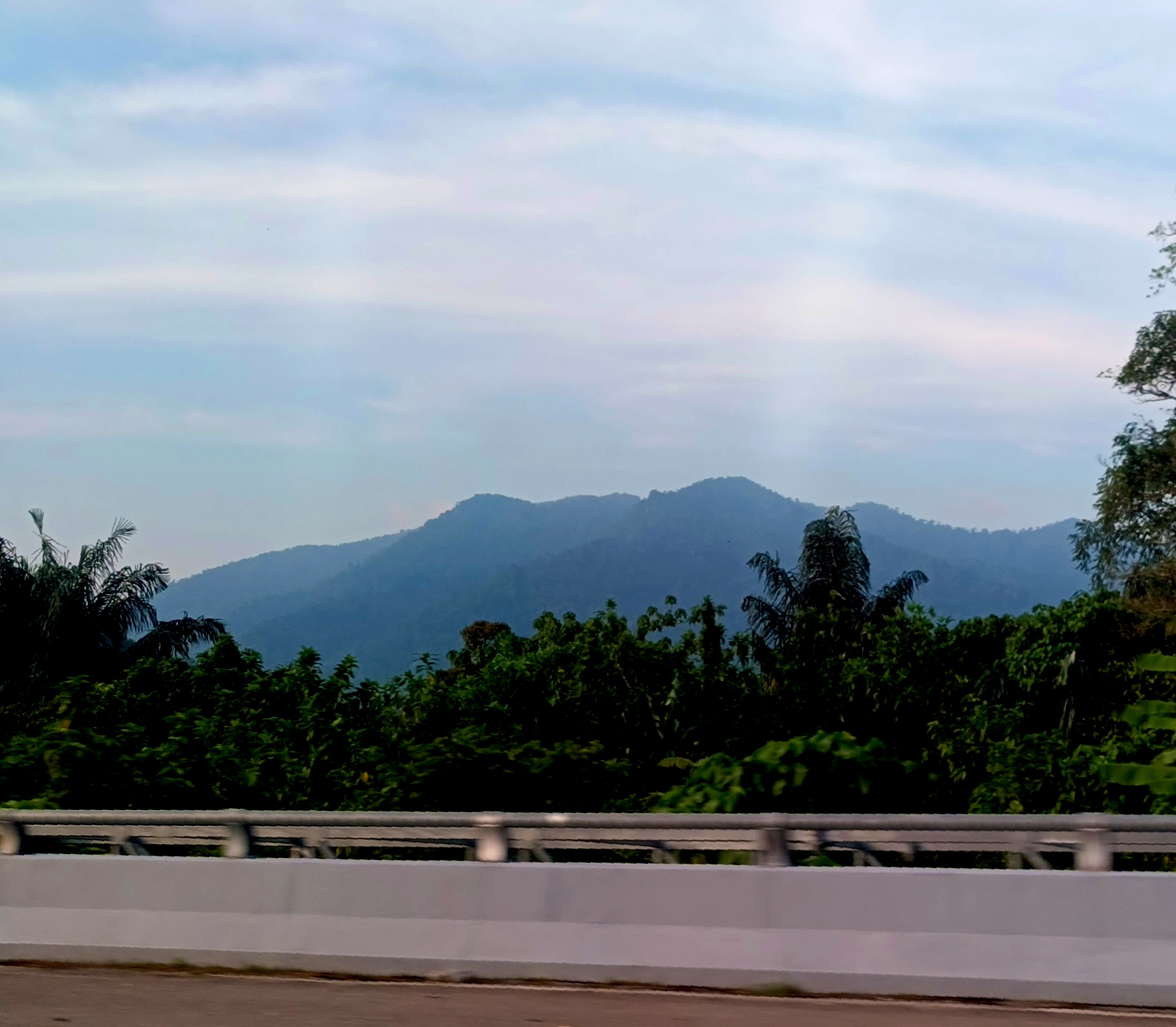
Mount Datuk as seen from Federal Route FT 1 near Kota.

== See also ==
- List of mountains in Malaysia
