= Melewar of Negeri Sembilan =

Yamtuan Besar of Negeri Sembilan from 1773 to 1795

Melewar مليوار
- Yamtuan Besar of Negeri Sembilan
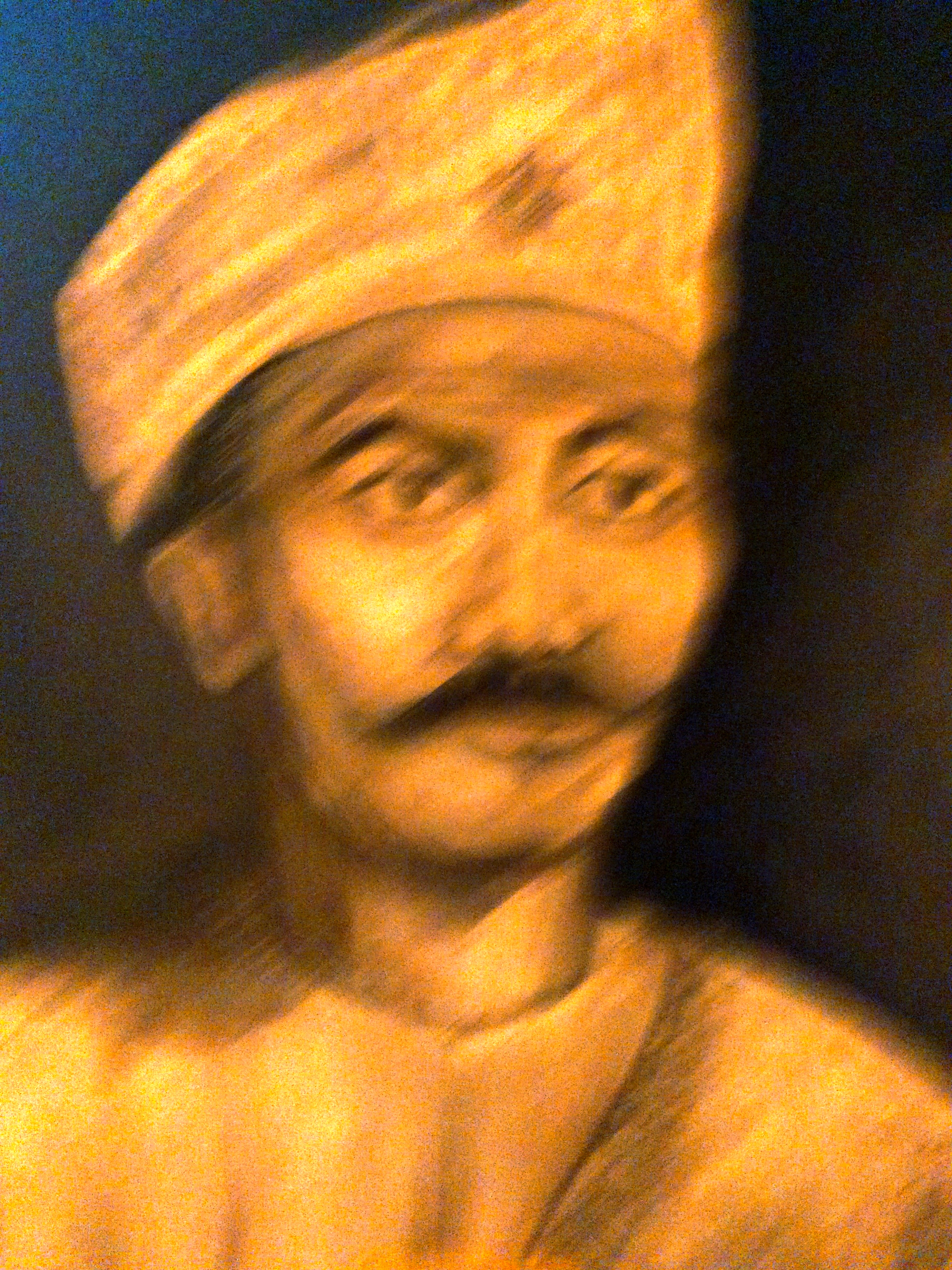
- Predecessor: position established
- Successor: Raja Hitam

1st Yamtuan Besar of Negeri Sembilan
- Reign: 1773 – 1795
- Born: Pagaruyung Kingdom
- Died: 1795; Rembau, Negeri Sembilan
- Burial: Astana Raja, Rembau District, Negeri Sembilan, Malaysia
- Spouse: Che Seni binti Datuk Penghulu Naam; Che Puan Jangka binti Datuk Penghulu Ulu Muar
- Issue: Tunku Puan Aishah; Tunku Totok; Tunku Kadir
Names
- Raja Mahmud ibni Sultan Abdul Jalil
Regnal name
- Raja Melewar
- Dynasty: Pagaruyung
- Father: Sultan Abdul Jalil Johan Berdaulat (Sultan Munim Shah III)
- Mother: Ratna Indusari
- Religion: Sunni Islam

Raja Mahmud ibni Almarhum Sultan Abdul Jalil (Jawi: راج محمود ابن المرحوم سلطان عبد الجليل), known as Raja Melewar (Jawi: راج مليوار), was the first Yamtuan Besar of Negeri Sembilan. He was a prince from the Pagaruyung Kingdom in Sumatra, now situated within modern day Indonesia.

== History ==
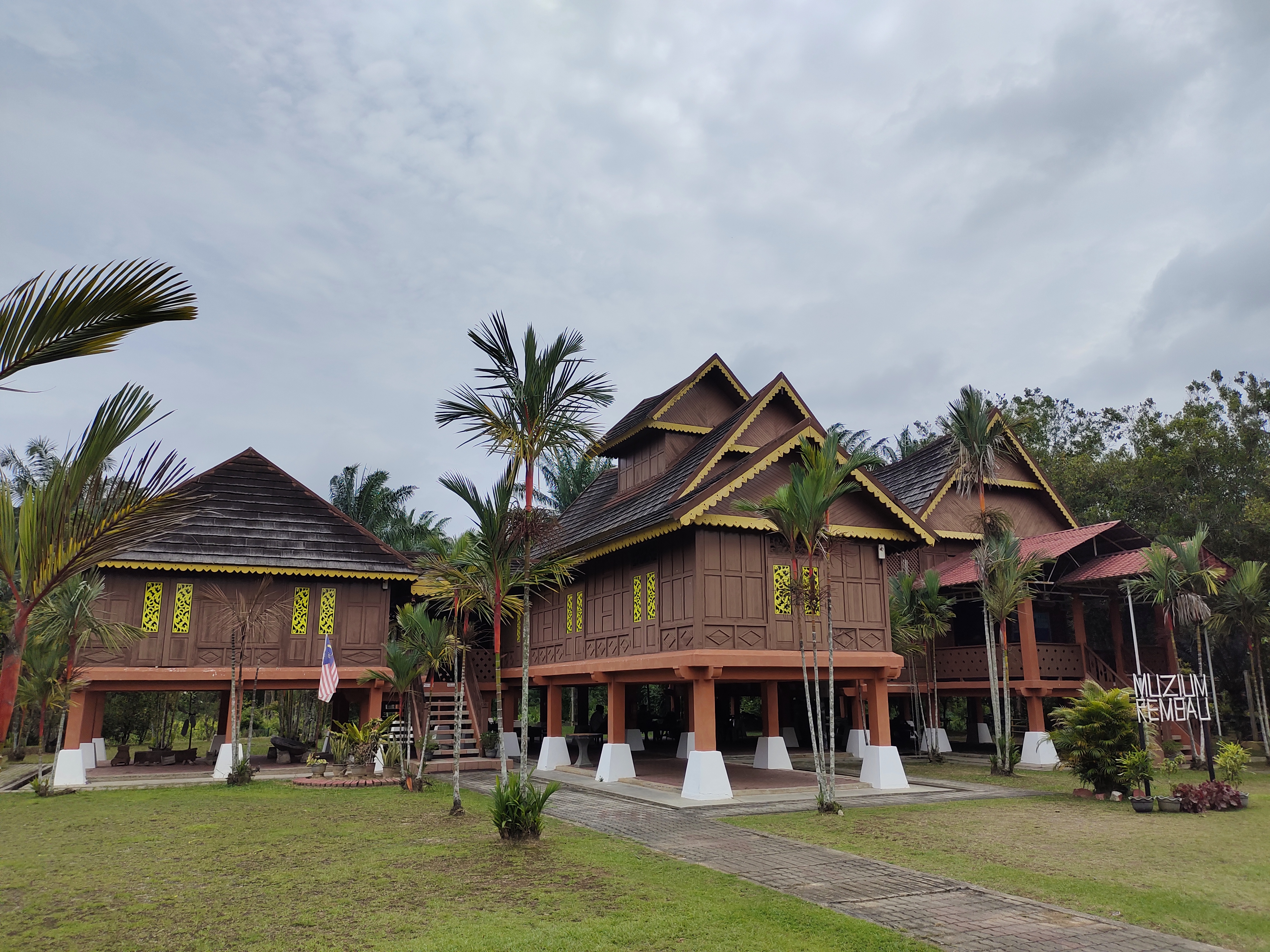
The Rembau Museum in Astana Raja, a replica of Raja Melewar's palace shortly after his installation as Yamtuan Besar in nearby Kampung Penajis

The Minangkabau people were the first migrant community to settle in the area north of the Malacca Sultanate which eventually formed the confederation of Negeri Sembilan circa the 15th century. After the Portuguese invaded Malacca in 1511, it then became a protectorate of its successor, the Sultanate of Johor. The population began to control local politics.

By 1760, Johor, which was having trouble from the Dutch, allowed the state to appoint a ruler from Pagaruyung in Sumatra.

Between 1760 and 1770, a council of leaders known as the datuk-datuk penghulu luak (the predecessor of the modern datuk-datuk undang) embarked in a negotiation expedition to Pagaruyung in the Minangkabau Highlands, in search of a leader. The Yamtuan of Pagaruyung, Sultan Abdul Jalil Johan Berdaulat, obliged and gave them a leader in the form of his son, Raja Mahmud.

Before Raja Mahmud left for the Malay Peninsula, a member of royalty named Raja Khatib was sent to Negeri Sembilan to oversee Raja Mahmud's installation preparations. However, upon his arrival to Negeri Sembilan, Raja Khatib deceived the locals and claimed to be the prince sent from Pagaruyung. The locals believed him, and Raja Khatib was deemed the new king. Raja Mahmud, first sailed to Johor to ask for the Sultan of Johor's consent to rule over Negeri Sembilan. The Sultan of Johor, Mahmud Shah III, did not object and conferred upon Raja Mahmud the authority to reign over Negeri Sembilan. Raja Mahmud's expedition marched to Negeri Sembilan through Naning.

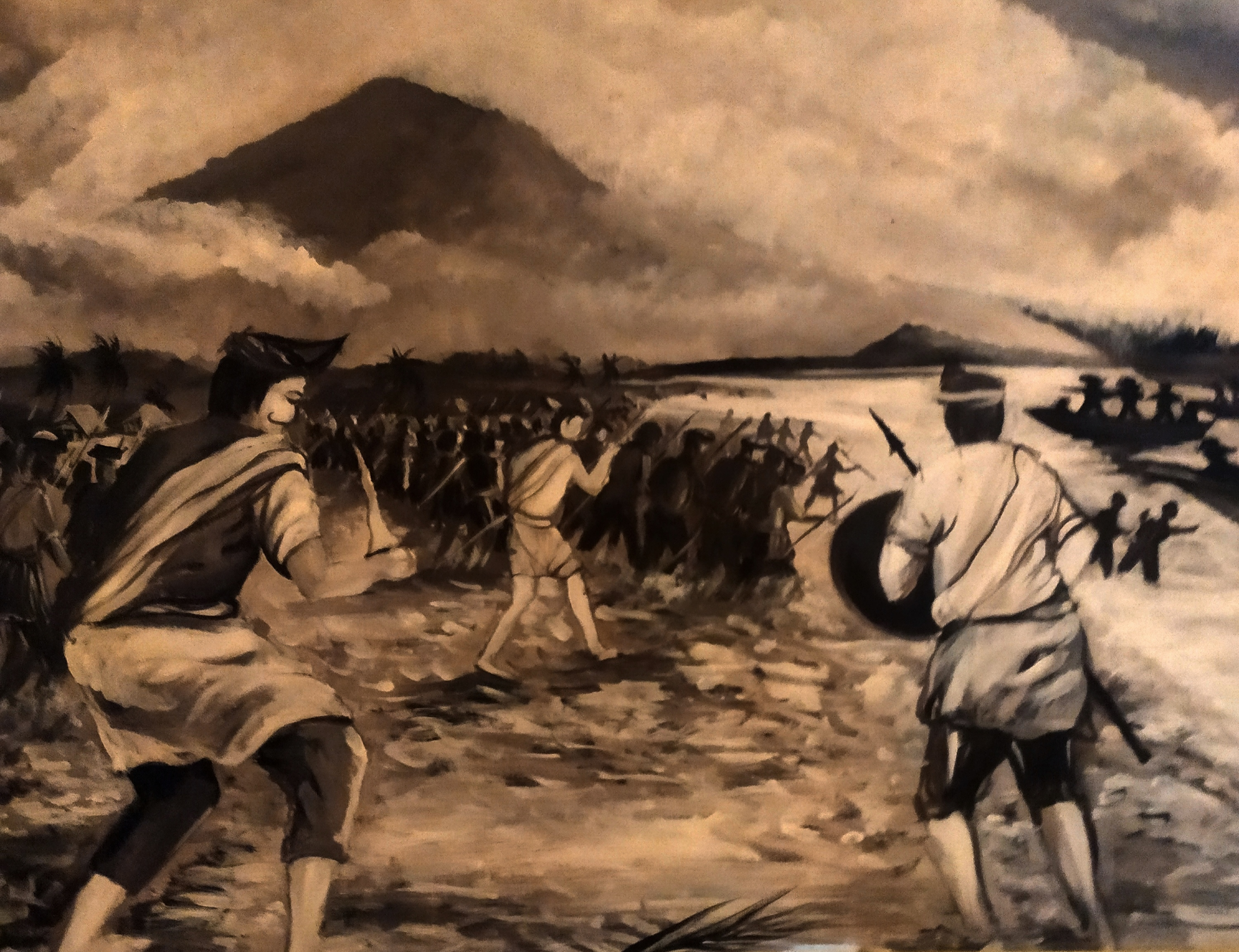
A portrait in the Rembau Museum depicting a war between Raja Melewar and Daeng Kemboja in Naning, while en route to Rembau in 1773.

At Naning in 1773, Raja Mahmud's forces met Bugis warchief, the Yamtuan Muda of Riau Daeng Kemboja. War ensued, which ended with the Bugis forces defeated. Upon his arrival to Negeri Sembilan, Raja Mahmud was deemed king and invested as Yamtuan Besar in Kampung Penajis in Rembau, as Raja Melewar. Raja Melewar learned of Raja Khatib's scheme and to become the undisputed ruler of the state, declared war against Raja Khatib. Raja Melewar later relocated his palace to Seri Menanti, which remains the royal capital of Negeri Sembilan.

== Death and legacy ==
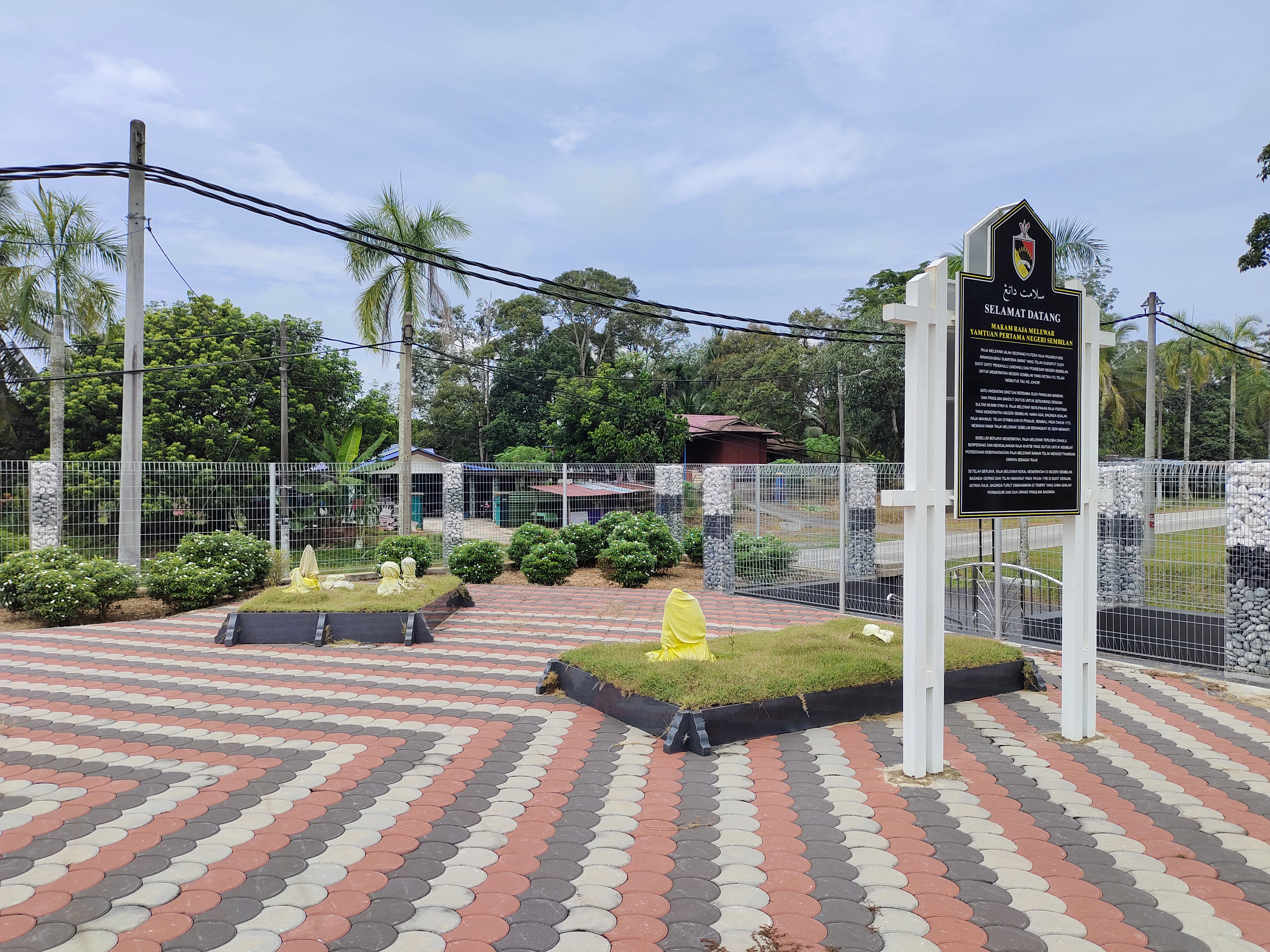
Tomb of Raja Melewar

In 1795, Raja Melewar fell ill while visiting Rembau, and died soon after. He was buried in the village of Astana Raja along with his consort and two other warriors. Following his death, rather than selecting his son as their new leader, the datuk-datuk penghulu luak once again journeyed to Minangkabau. The Yamtuan of Pagaruyung gave another son, Raja Hitam, to serve as their new Yamtuan. Raja Hitam married Raja Melewar's daughter, Tengku Aishah, but they did not have children.

Selecting a ruler of Negeri Sembilan by a council of ruling chiefs in the state, or the datuk-datuk undang, became an implemented system. Under which, the person selected assumes the position of Yang di-Pertuan Besar, or Yamtuan Besar, a post that began in 1773. This system would become the inspiration behind the position of the Yang di-Pertuan Agong (Paramount Ruler) of Malaysia, where each ruler from the nine monarchical states is elected by the Conference of Rulers (Malay: Majlis Raja-Raja) every 5 years.

== See also ==
- Yang di-Pertuan Muda of Riau, title of Melewar's opponent Daeng Kemboja

Regnal titles
Preceded by Title created	Yamtuan Besar; Yamtuan Besar of Negeri Sembilan; 1773-1795	Succeeded by Raja Hitam
