= Bongek =

Mukim in Rembau, Negeri Sembilan, Malaysia

- Village and mukim
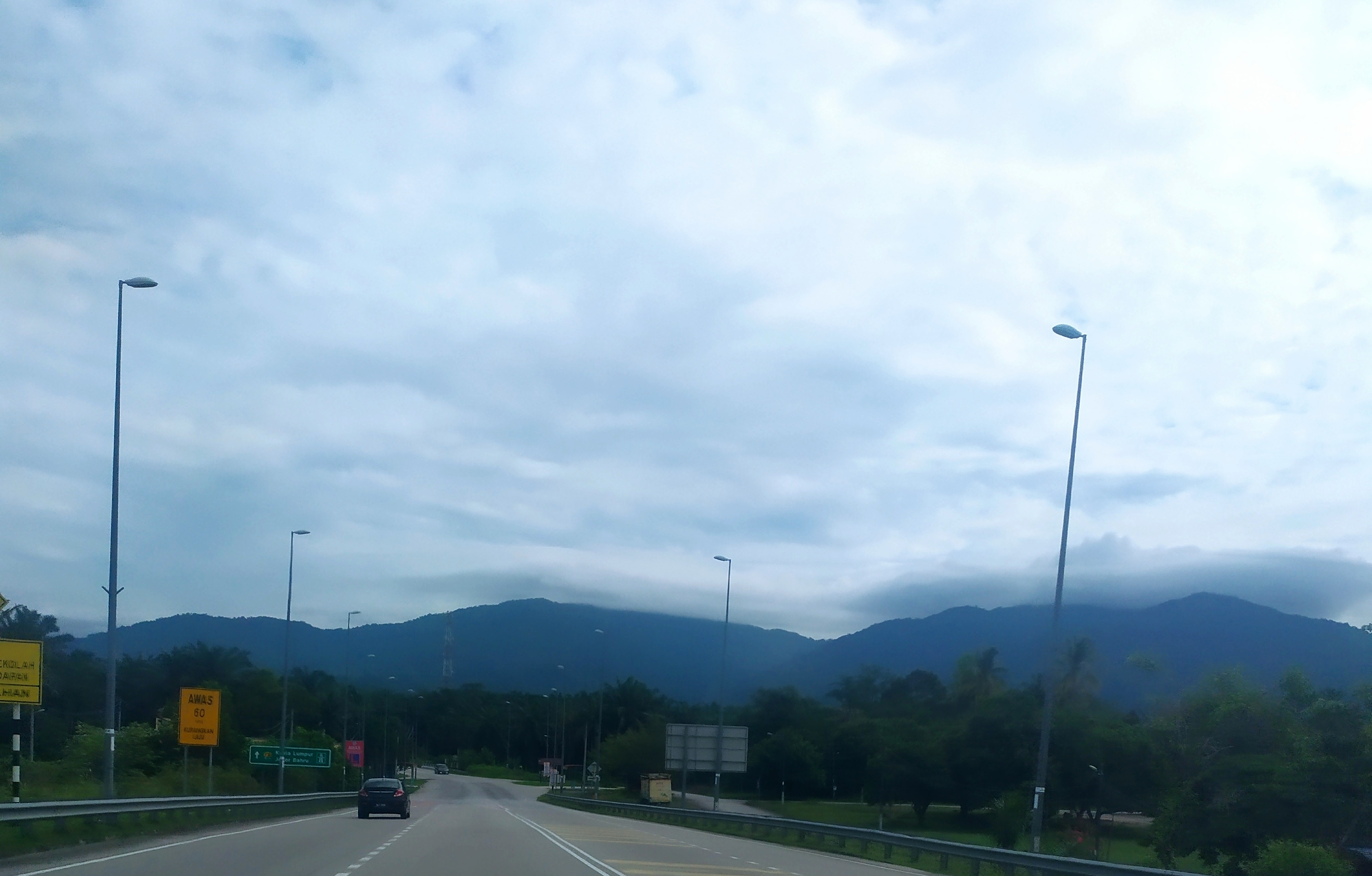
- The Titiwangsa Mountains and Federal Route 1 in Bongek
- Interactive map of Bongek
- Coordinates: 2°33′54″N 102°07′35″E
- Country: Malaysia
- State: Negeri Sembilan
- Luak/District: Rembau

Bongek in Rembau District

Bongek is a mukim in Rembau District, Negeri Sembilan, Malaysia.
