= Chembong =

Mukim in Rembau, Negeri Sembilan, Malaysia

Coordinates: 2°36′23.9″N 102°05′16.0″E

Chembong Chombong (Negeri Sembilan Malay)
- Mukim
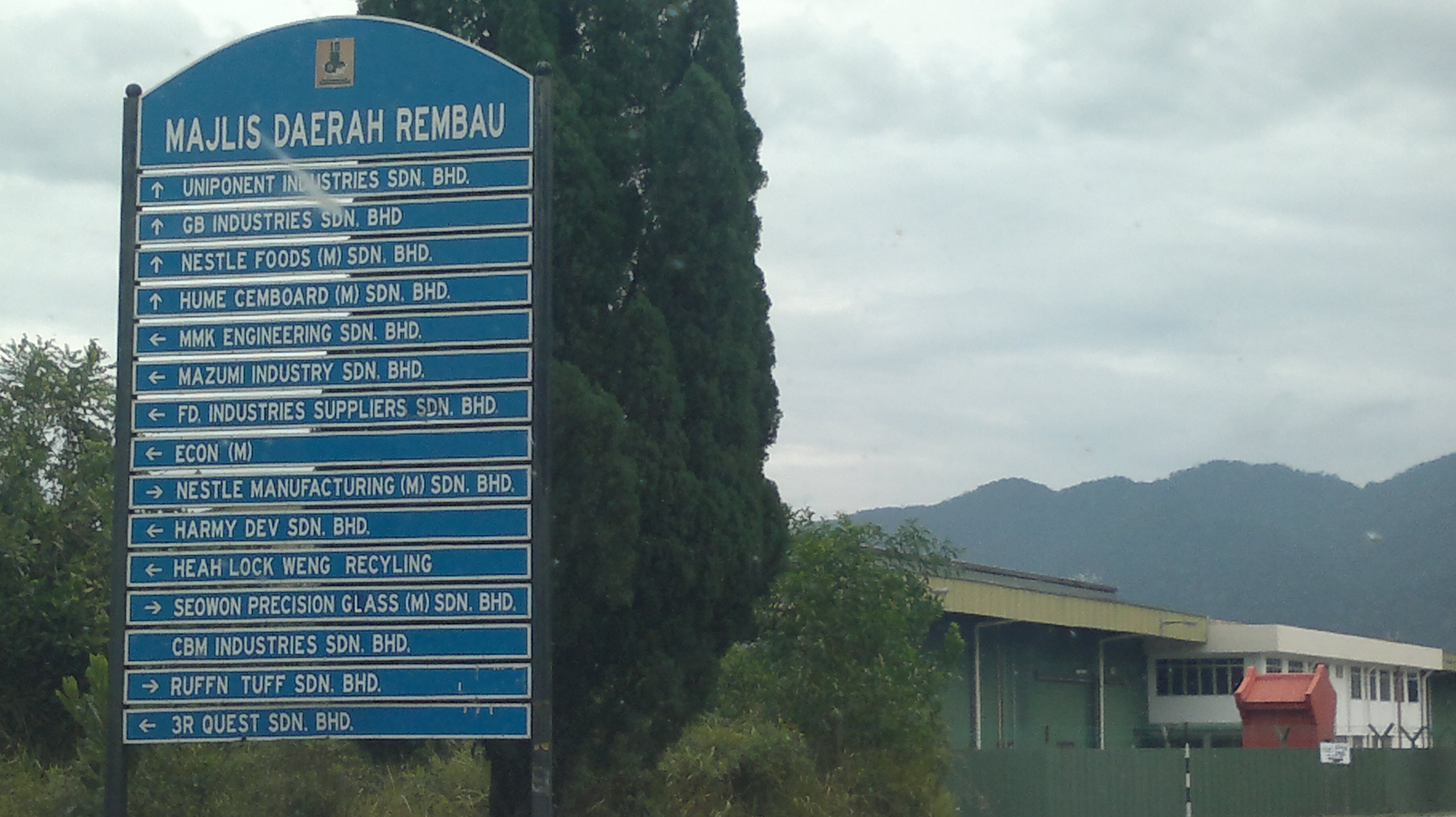
- Chembong Industrial Area
- Interactive map of Chembong
- Country: Malaysia
- State: Negeri Sembilan
- Luak/District: Rembau

Chembong in Rembau District

Chembong (Negeri Sembilan Malay: Chombong, Jawi: چمبوڠ) is a mukim in Rembau District, Negeri Sembilan, Malaysia. It is also the name for the State Assembly of Chembong whose elected representative is YB Tuan Zaifulbahri Bin Idris. In 2010, Chembong had a population of 12,196, consisting primarily of Malay and other Bumiputra in addition to small Chinese and Indian minorities. As a result, in addition to a multitude of mosques, Chembong also hosts Hindi and Chinese religious sites, including the Sri Maha Mariamman Temple, the Sri Subramaniyar Temple, and a Chinese Hokkien Temple north of the Taman Palong Road.

The majority of residents are farmers, government employees and factory workers. In September 2019, Nestlé Malaysia launched the expansion of its MILO Chembong Factory, which started operations in 1993. The facility is now the world's largest Milo manufacturing site.
