= Rembau (town) =

Town in Rembau, Negeri Sembilan, Malaysia

Rembau Ghombau (Negeri Sembilan Malay)
- Town and district capital
- Rembau Town; Bandar Rembau
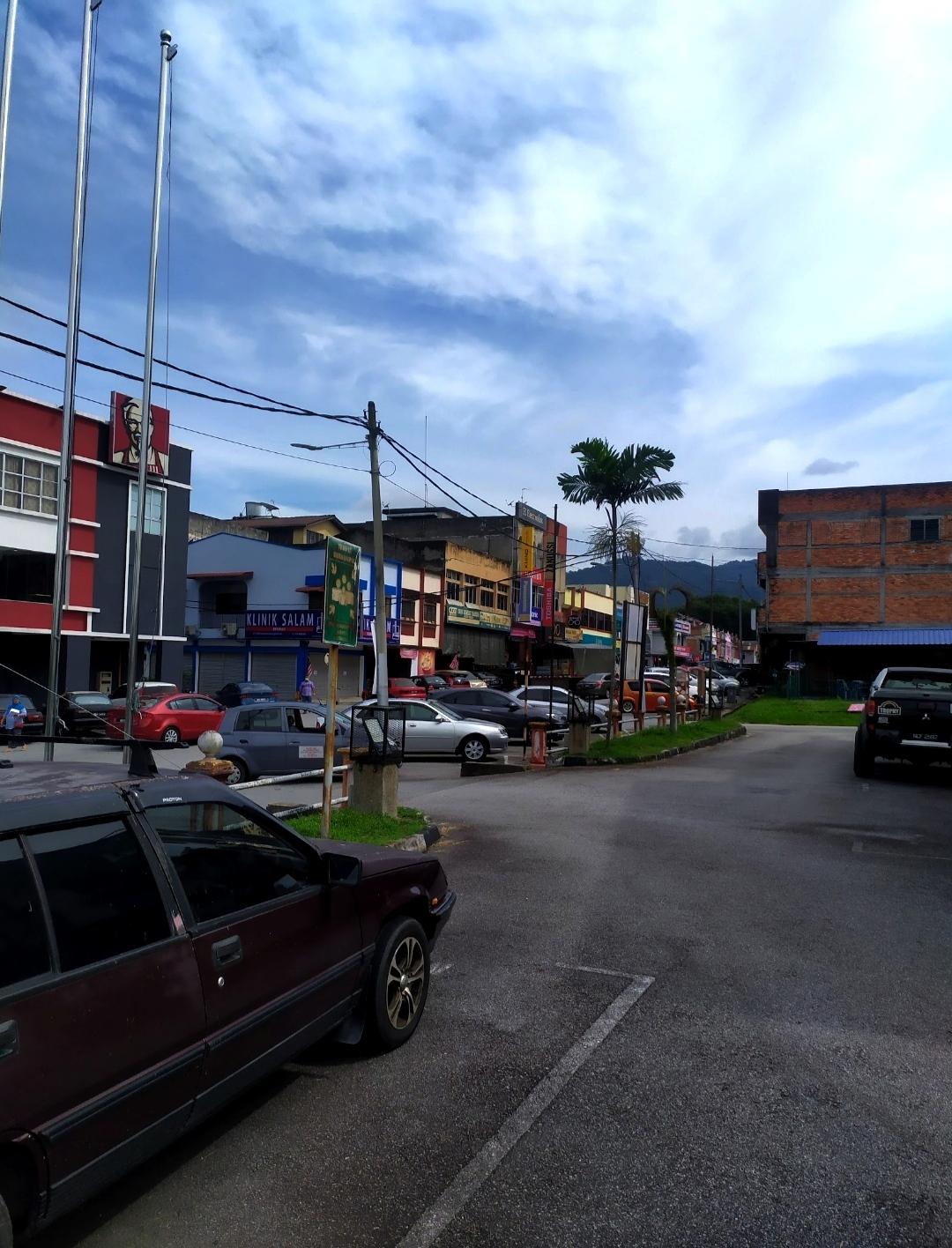
- Motto: Bersih, Indah, Segar
- Location within Peninsular Malaysia
- Coordinates: 2°35′30″N 102°05′45″E
- Country: Malaysia
- State: Negeri Sembilan
- District: Rembau
- Luak: Rembau

Government
  - Type: Local government
  - Body: Rembau District Council
  - President: Mohd Zamri Mohd Esa
  - MP: Mohamad Hasan (BN–UMNO)
  - MLA: Zaifulbahri Idris (BN–UMNO)
- Elevation: 58 m (190 ft)

Population (2010)
  - Total: 29,595
  - Demonym: Rembauians Rembauese
- Time zone: UTC+8 (MST)
  - Summer (DST): Not observed
- Postal code: 71xxx
- Mean solar time: UTC + 06:46:48
- National calling code: 06
- License plate prefix: Nxx (for all vehicles include taxis)
- Website: mdr.gov.my

Rembau District Council Majlis Daerah Rembau

Type
- Type: Local authority of the Rembau District

History
- Founded: 1 July 1980

Leadership
- President: Mohd Zamri Mohd Esa
- District Secretary: Shaiful Bahrin Baharudin

Motto
- Bersih, Indah, Segar (Clean, Beautiful, Fresh)

Meeting place
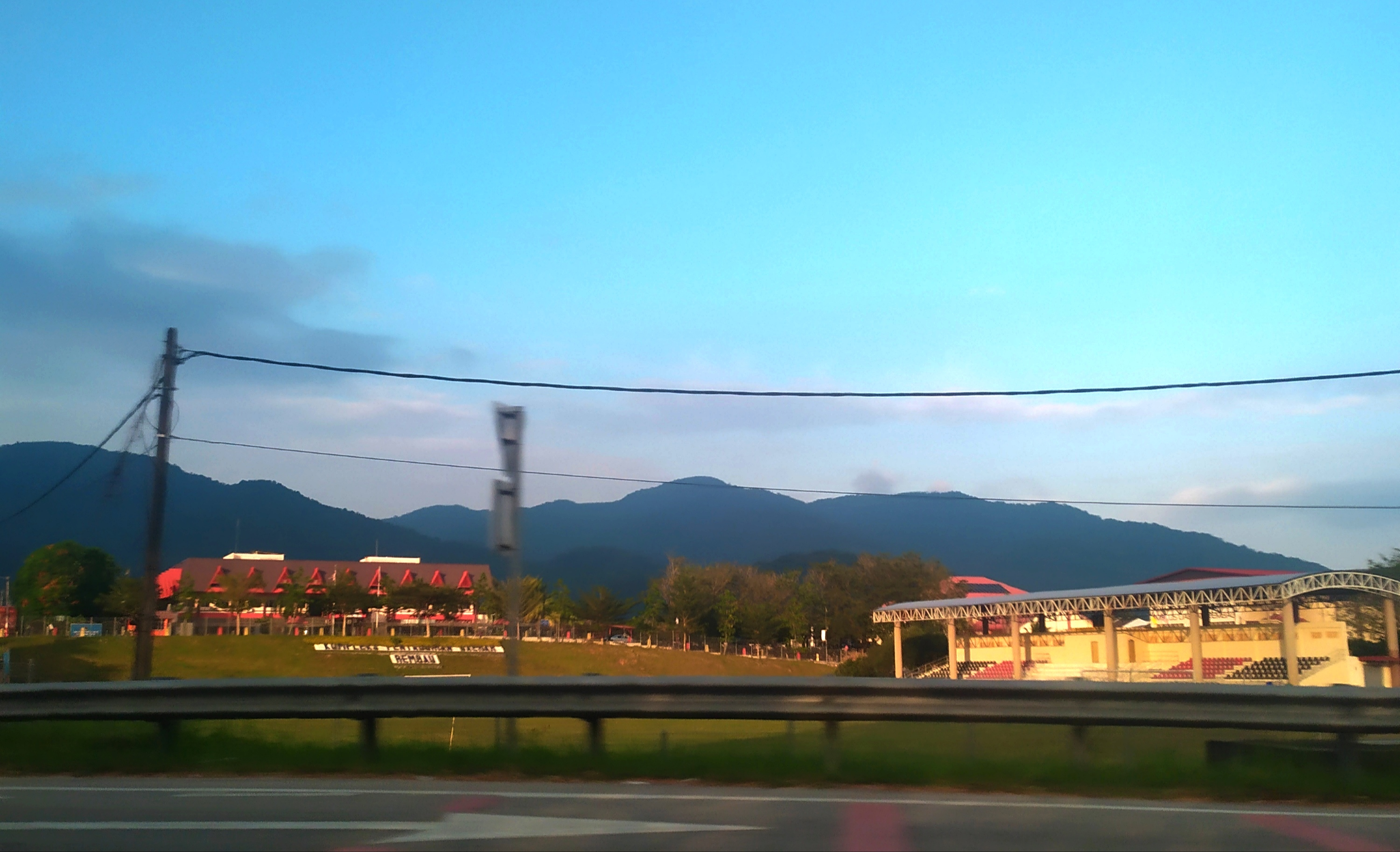
- Jalan Dato Lela Maharaja, 71309 Rembau, Negeri Sembilan

Website
- www.mdr.gov.my

Rembau (Negeri Sembilan Malay: Ghombau) is a town that is located in Rembau District, Negeri Sembilan, Malaysia. The township is situated about 25 km south from the state capital, Seremban, accessible through Federal Route 1. Most of the population are farmers, traders, government servants, factory workers and most of the young join the army and police force.

== Politics ==
Politically, only two out of four state assembly seats in the parliamentary constituency of Rembau, namely Kota and Chembong are administered by Rembau. The other two seats, Rantau and Paroi are instead administered by the Seremban City Council.

== Gallery ==
Location of Rembau in Rembau District

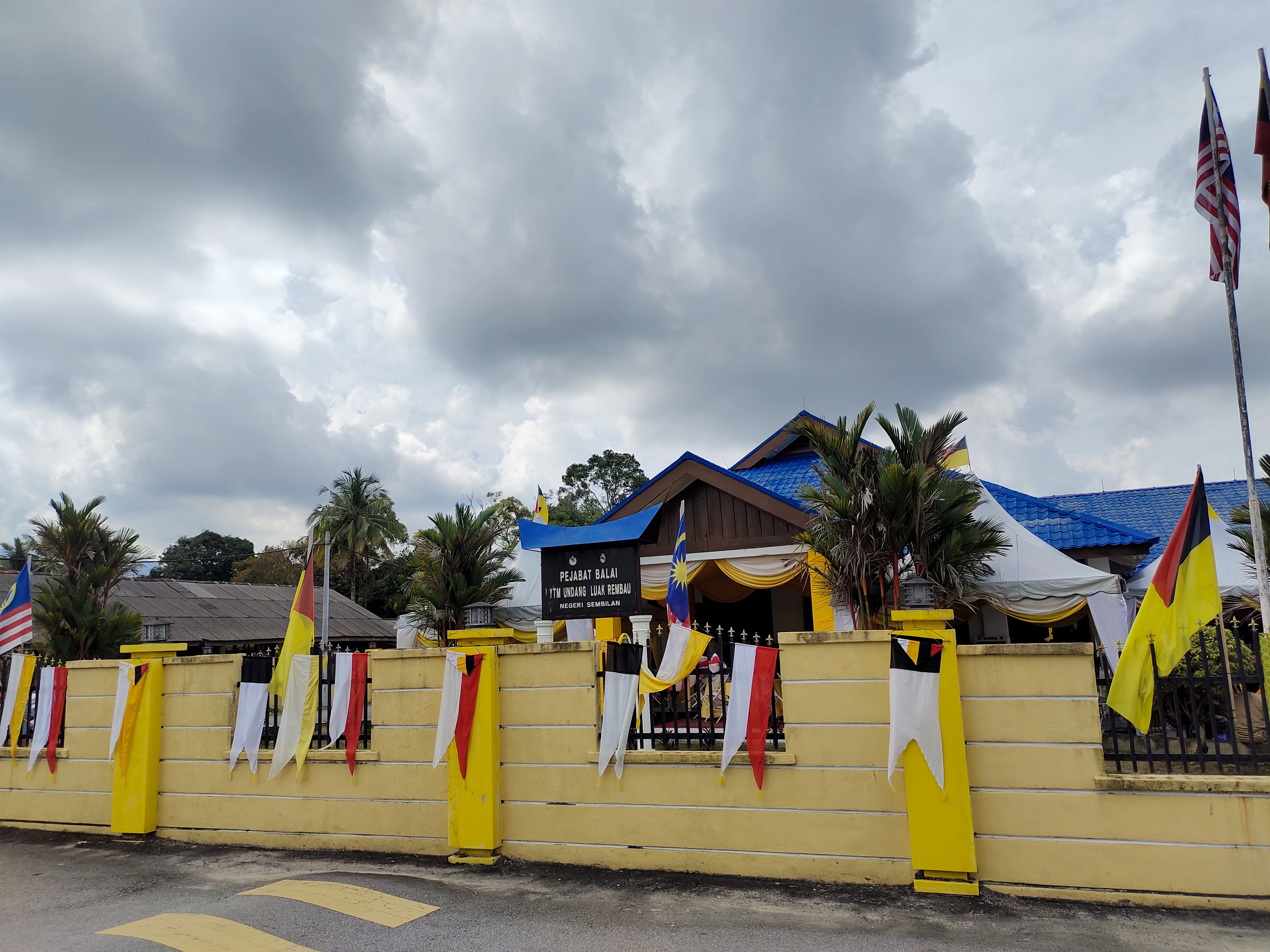
Sri Rama, the official residence of the Undang of Rembau

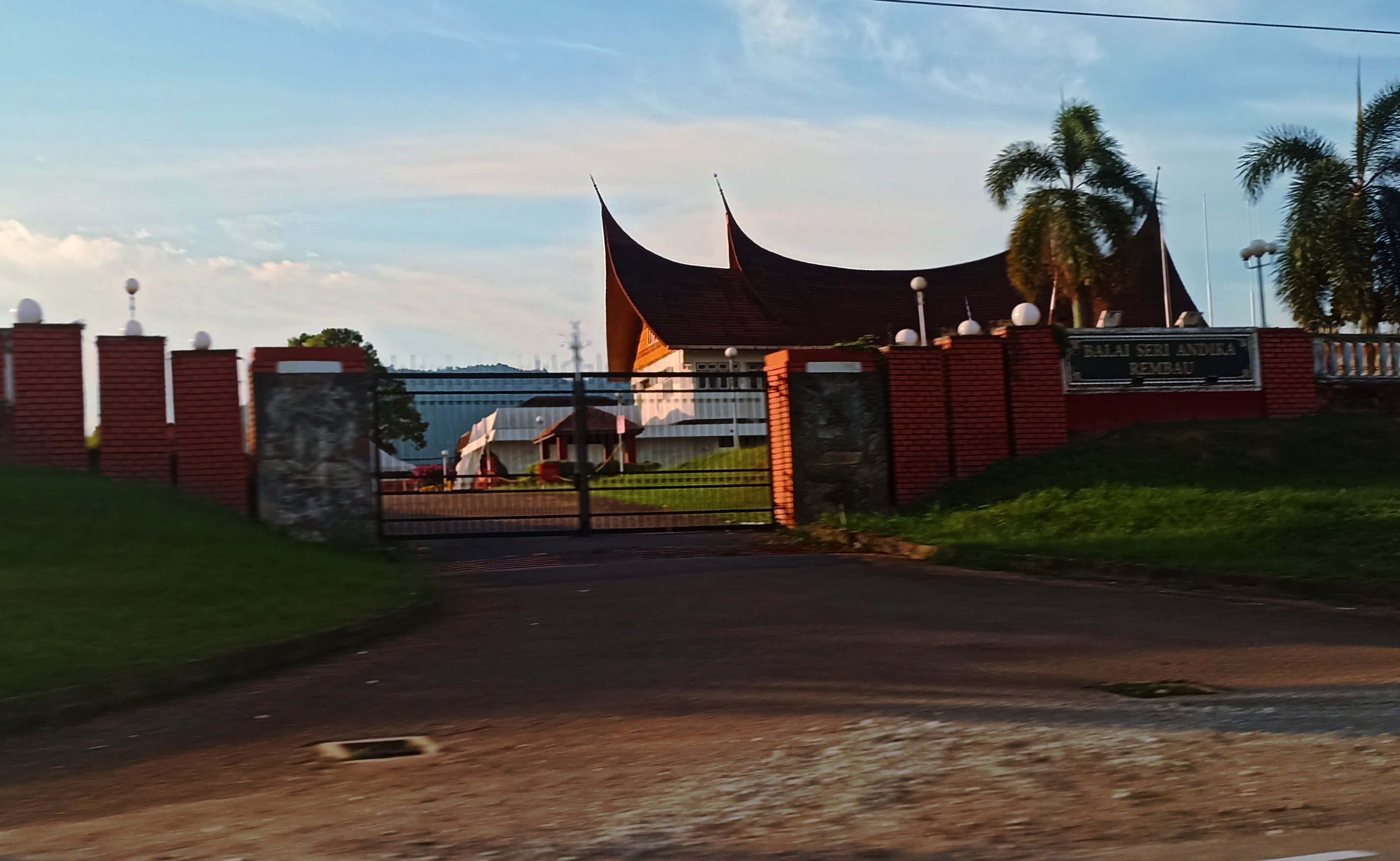
Seri Andika, the former residence of the Undang

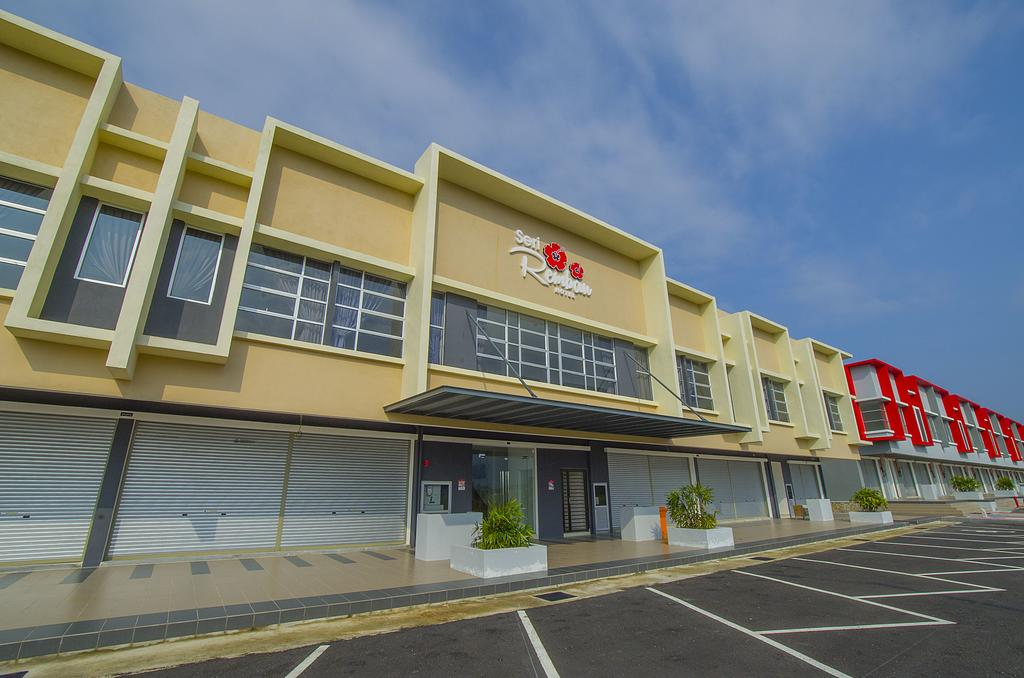
Shophouses at the town's main commercial centre in Taman Sri Rembau

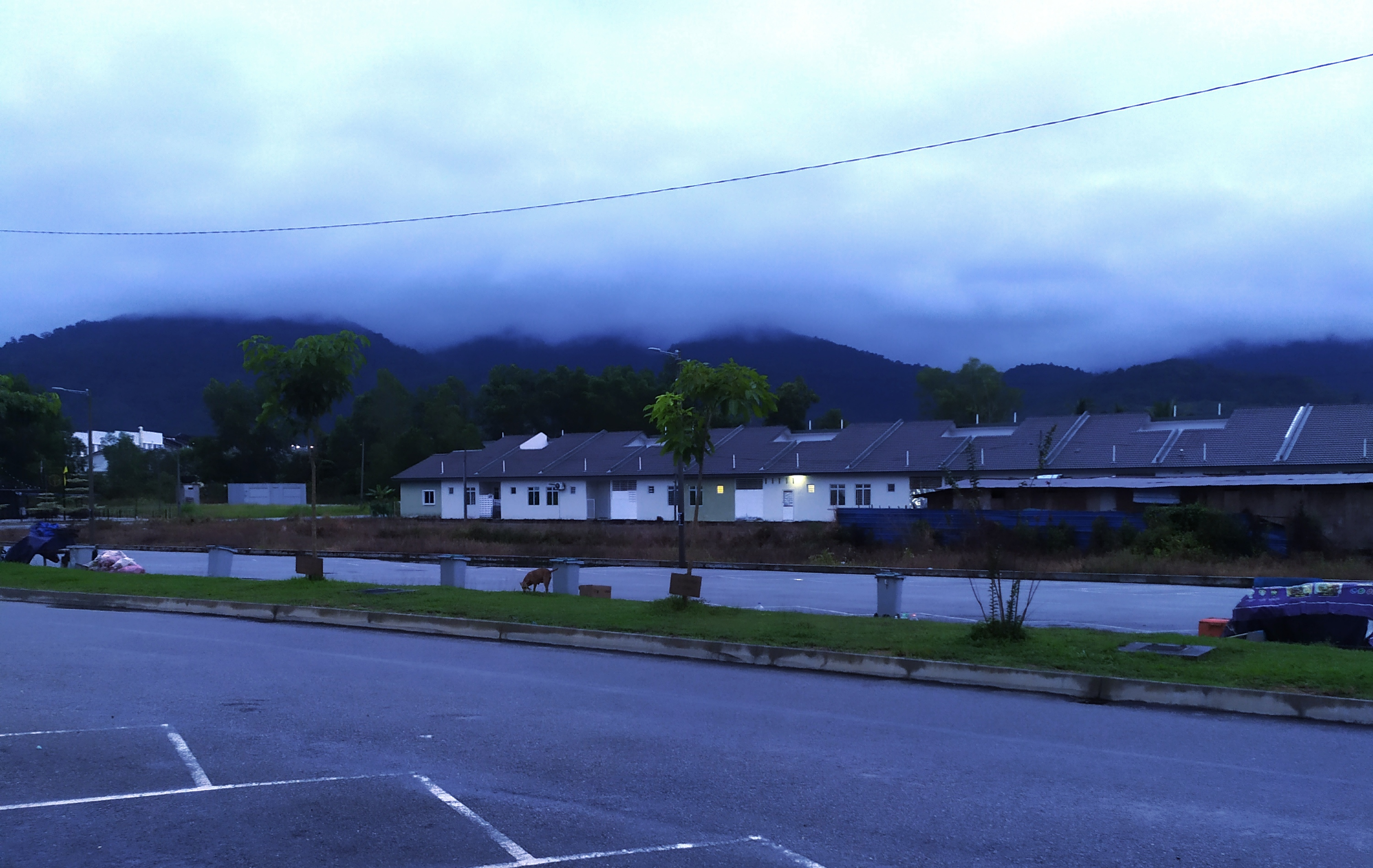
The Titiwangsa Mountains at blue hour, seen from Taman Sri Rembau

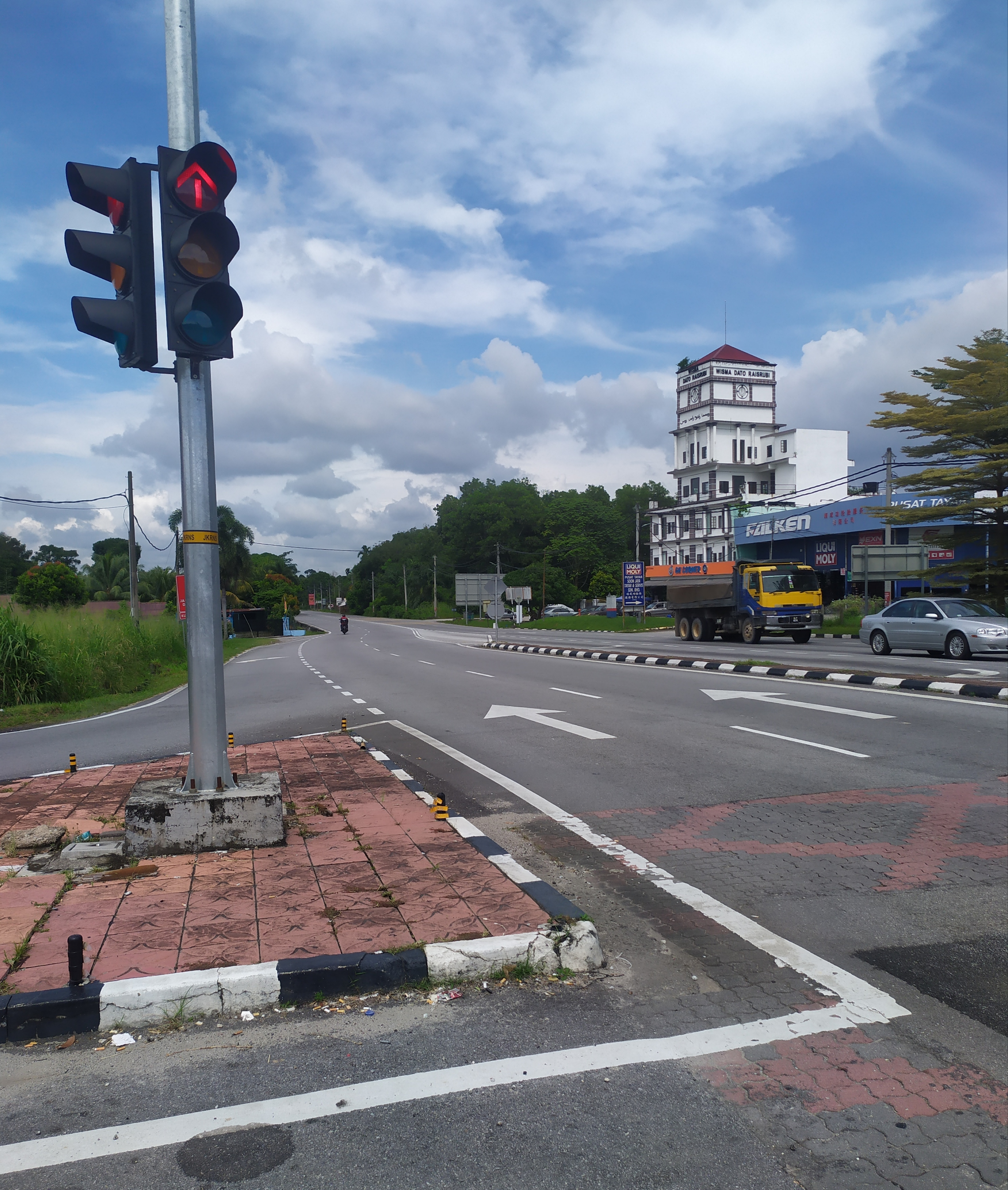
Jalan Seremban–Tampin, a section of Federal Route 1 in Rembau

== Transportation ==
=== Car ===
Federal Route 1 is the main thoroughfare serving Rembau town. Exit 223 on the North–South Expressway Southern Route serves Rembau.

=== Public transport ===
==== Rail ====
KB16 Rembau railway station serves the town. It is a stop on the KTM Komuter Seremban Line (Batu Caves – Pulau Sebang route), operated by Keretapi Tanah Melayu (KTMB).

==== Bus ====
Bus services in Rembau are operated by BAS.MY, connecting the town to Seremban and Tampin. These buses serve the Rembau Bus Station located in the town centre.

- N60A : Terminal 1 Seremban – Tampin via Senawang
- N60B : Terminal 1 Seremban – Tampin via Seremban Jaya
