= Kota, Negeri Sembilan =

Coordinates: 2.517°N 102.167°E

Kota (Negeri Sembilan Malay: Koto) is a small town in Rembau District, Negeri Sembilan, Malaysia, situated along Federal Route 1. The postcode for this small town is 71350. This small town contains a few villages (kampung) such as Kampung Legong Ulu, Kampung Gadong, Kampung Sri Kendong, Kampung Sawah Raja and a few others.

There was a train station in the 1960s but the train station was destroyed by a group of communists during the "darurat 13 hari" (the 13 days of terror). A new train station has been built at the site of the former train station and will be operating soon.

Kota is the closest town to Mount Datuk of the Titiwangsa Mountains, which is one of Negeri Sembilan's best known hiking spots.
