= Rembau District =

District in Negeri Sembilan, Malaysia

Rembau District Ghombau (Negeri Sembilan Malay)
- District of Negeri Sembilan
- Daerah Rembau
- Seal

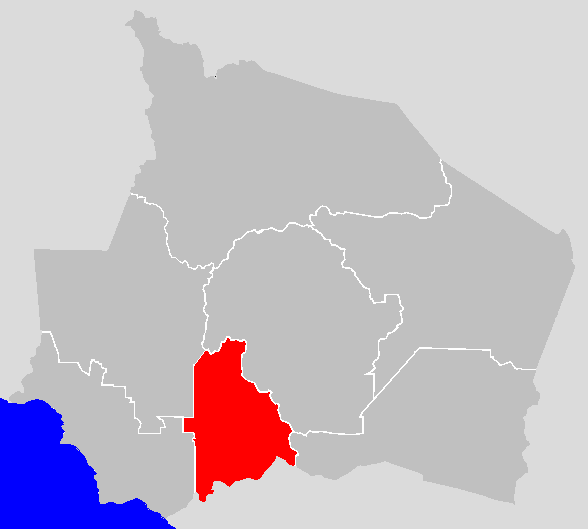
- Location of Rembau District in Negeri Sembilan
- Interactive map of Rembau District
- Location of Rembau District in Malaysia
- Coordinates: 2°35′N 102°05′E
- Country: Malaysia
- State: Negeri Sembilan
- Seat: Rembau
- Local area government(s): Rembau District Council

Government
  - District officer: Amino Agos Suyub

Area
  - Total: 415.12 km^{2} (160.28 sq mi)

Population (2010)
  - Total: 41,325
  - Density: 99.550/km^{2} (257.83/sq mi)
- Time zone: UTC+8 (MST)
  - Summer (DST): UTC+8 (Not observed)
- Postcode: 71xxx
- Calling code: +6-06
- Vehicle registration plates: N

Rembau
- Luak Berundang
- Luak Rembau
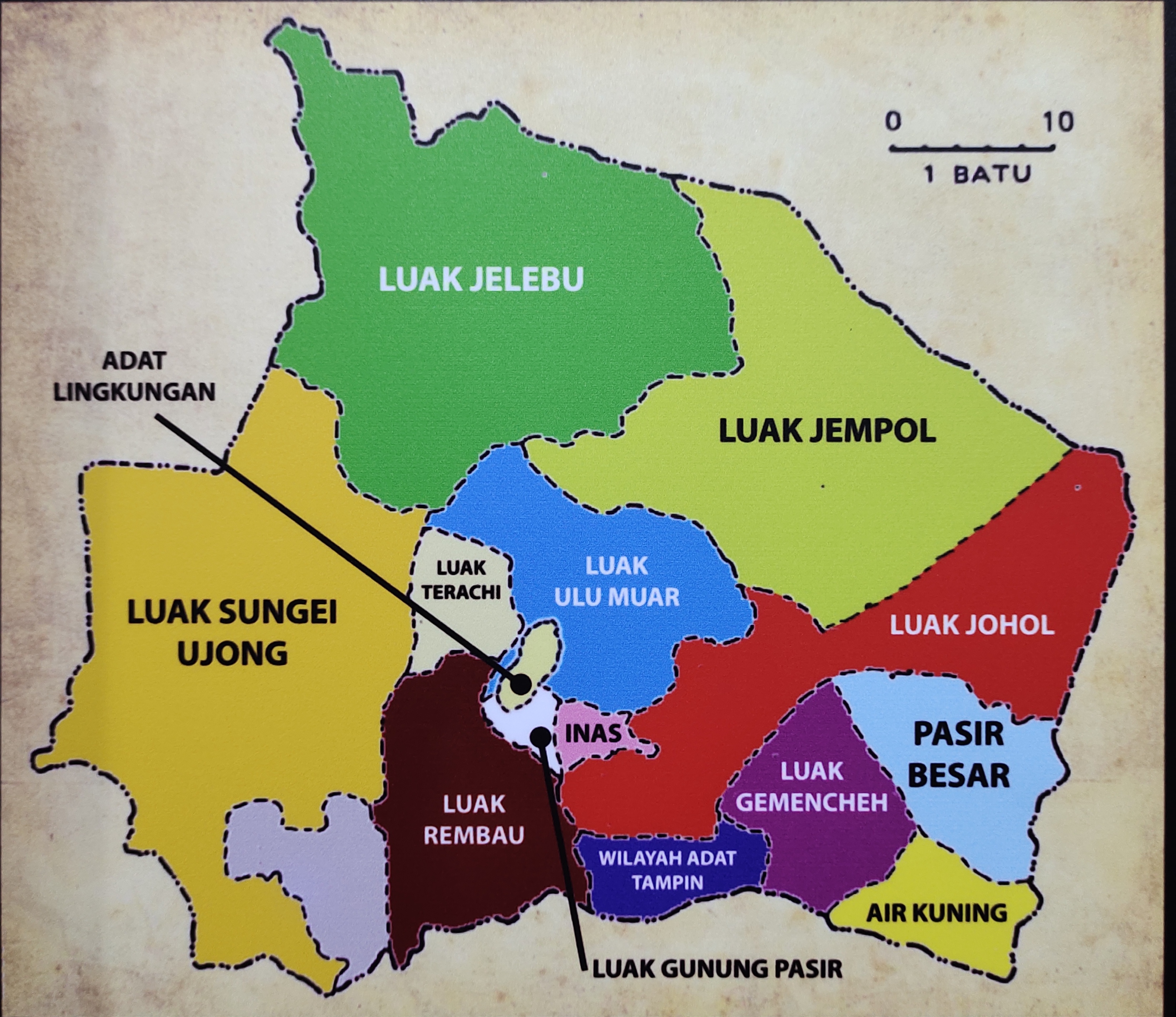
- Luak of Rembau relative to other luaks in Negeri Sembilan
- Country: Malaysia
- State: Negeri Sembilan
- Adat institution: Undang of Rembau

Government
  - Undang: Hassan Ab Hamid

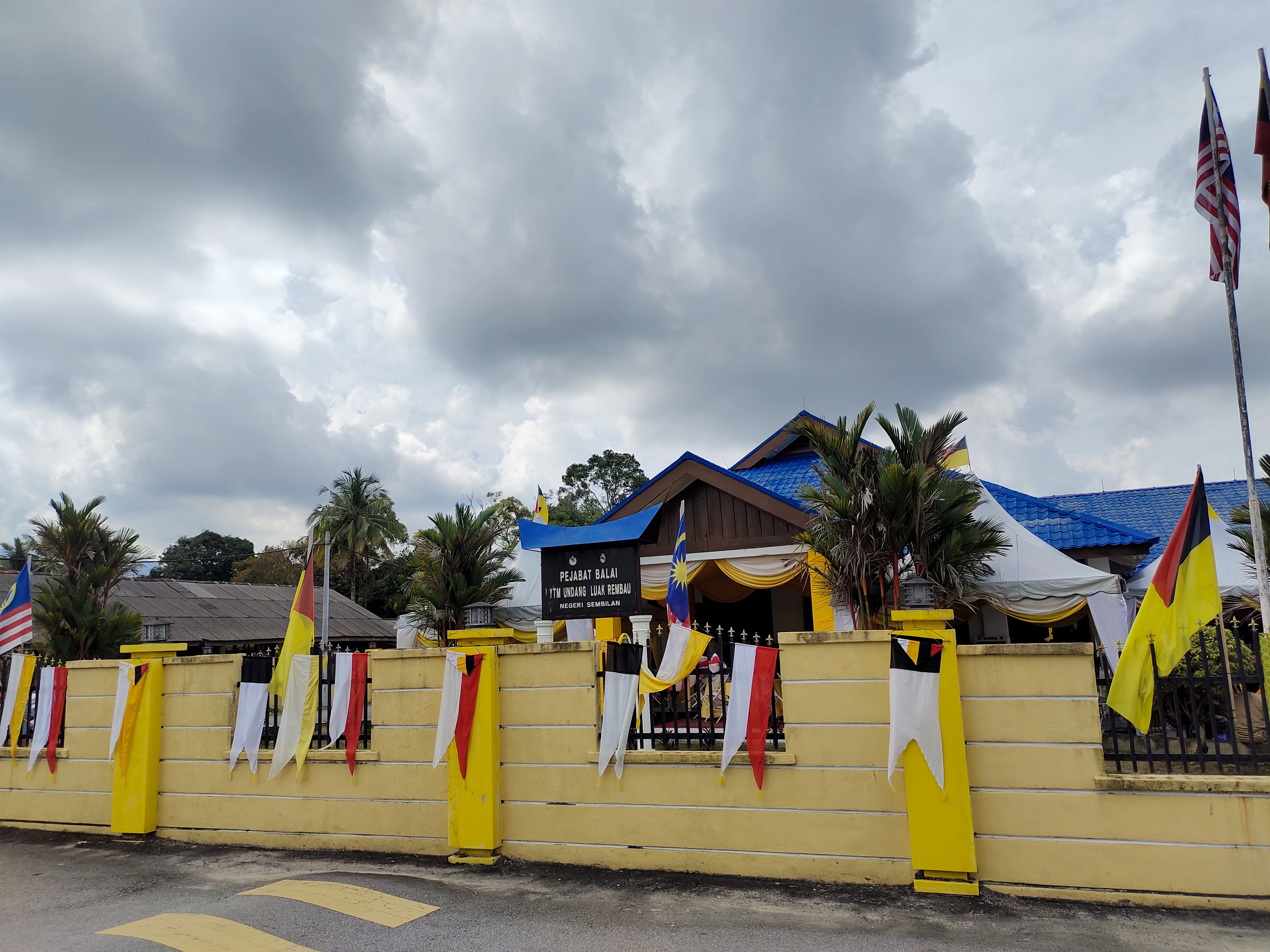
Sri Rama, the official residence of the Undang of Rembau

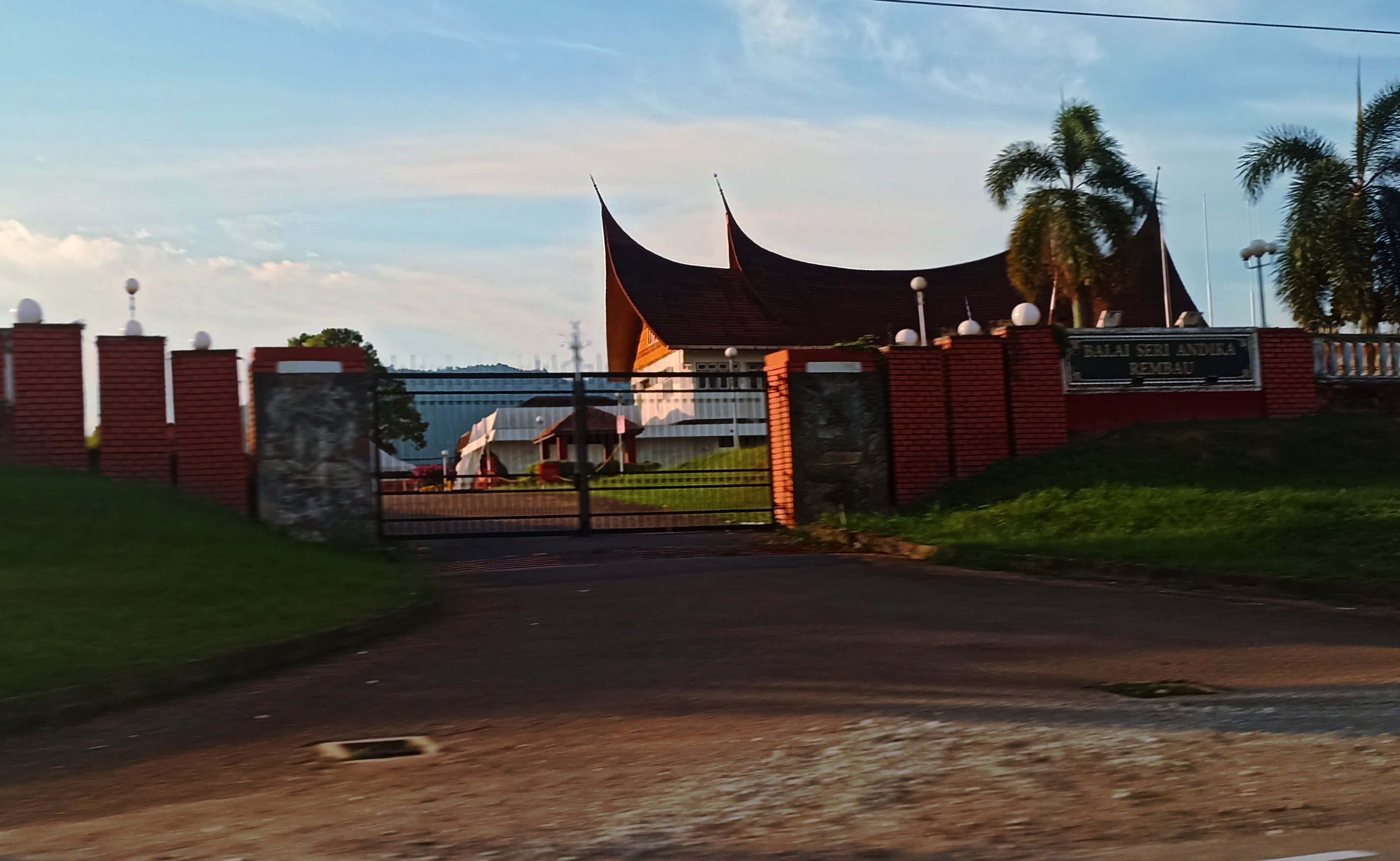
Seri Andika, the former residence of the Undang

The Rembau District (Negeri Sembilan Malay: Ghombau) is a district that is located in the state of Negeri Sembilan, Malaysia. The district is a stronghold of the matrilineal system known as adat perpatih, a customary practice inherited from the Minangkabaus, of Sumatra. The district borders Seremban District to the north, Port Dickson District to the west, Tampin District to the east, Kuala Pilah District to the northeast and Alor Gajah District, Malacca to the southwest.

Rembau still maintains the old district ruler, which used to be called the district head or Penghulu. Now the title is Yang Teramat Mulia Undang Luak Rembau. He is one of the electors to the throne of Yang di-Pertuan Besar of Negeri Sembilan, besides Sungai Ujong, Jelebu, Johol and Tampin.

== Administrative divisions ==

Rembau District consists of 17 mukims, which are:

- Batu Hampar
- Bongek
- Chembong
- Chengkau
- Gadong
- Kundur
- Legong Hilir
- Legong Hulu
- Miku
- Nerasau
- Pedas
- Pilin
- Selemak
- Semerbok
- Sepri
- Tanjung Keling
- Titian Bintangor

== Demographics ==
Historical population
Year	Pop.	±%
1991	34,823	—
2000	36,848	+5.8%
2010	41,988	+13.9%
2020	47,278	+12.6%

== Federal Parliament and State Assembly Seats ==
List of Rembau district representatives in the Federal Parliament (Dewan Rakyat)

Parliament	Seat Name	Member of Parliament	Party
P131	Rembau	Mohamad Hasan	Barisan Nasional (UMNO)

List of Rembau district representatives in the State Legislative Assembly (Dewan Undangan Negeri)

Parliament	State	Seat Name	State Assemblyman	Party
P131	N26	Chembong	Zaifulbahri Idris	Barisan Nasional (UMNO)
P131	N28	Kota	Suhaimi Aini	Barisan Nasional (UMNO)

== See also ==
- Districts of Malaysia
