= Bukit Putus =

Bukit Putus ('Separated Hill' in Indonesian and Malay) may refer to:

- Bukit Putus, Negeri Sembilan, a mountain pass in Malaysia
- Bukit Putus Viaduct, fourth highest bridge in Malaysia
- Battle of Bukit Putus, an 1875 battle during the British intervention in Negeri Sembilan and subsequent civil war.
- Jalan Lama Bukit Putus, federal road in Negeri Sembilan, Malaysia
