= Titiwangsa Forest Complex =

Forest in Peninsular Malaysia

- Location: Titiwangsa Mountains, Peninsular Malaysia

The Titiwangsa Forest Complex runs along the Titiwangsa Mountains and forms part of the Central Forest Spine of Peninsular Malaysia.

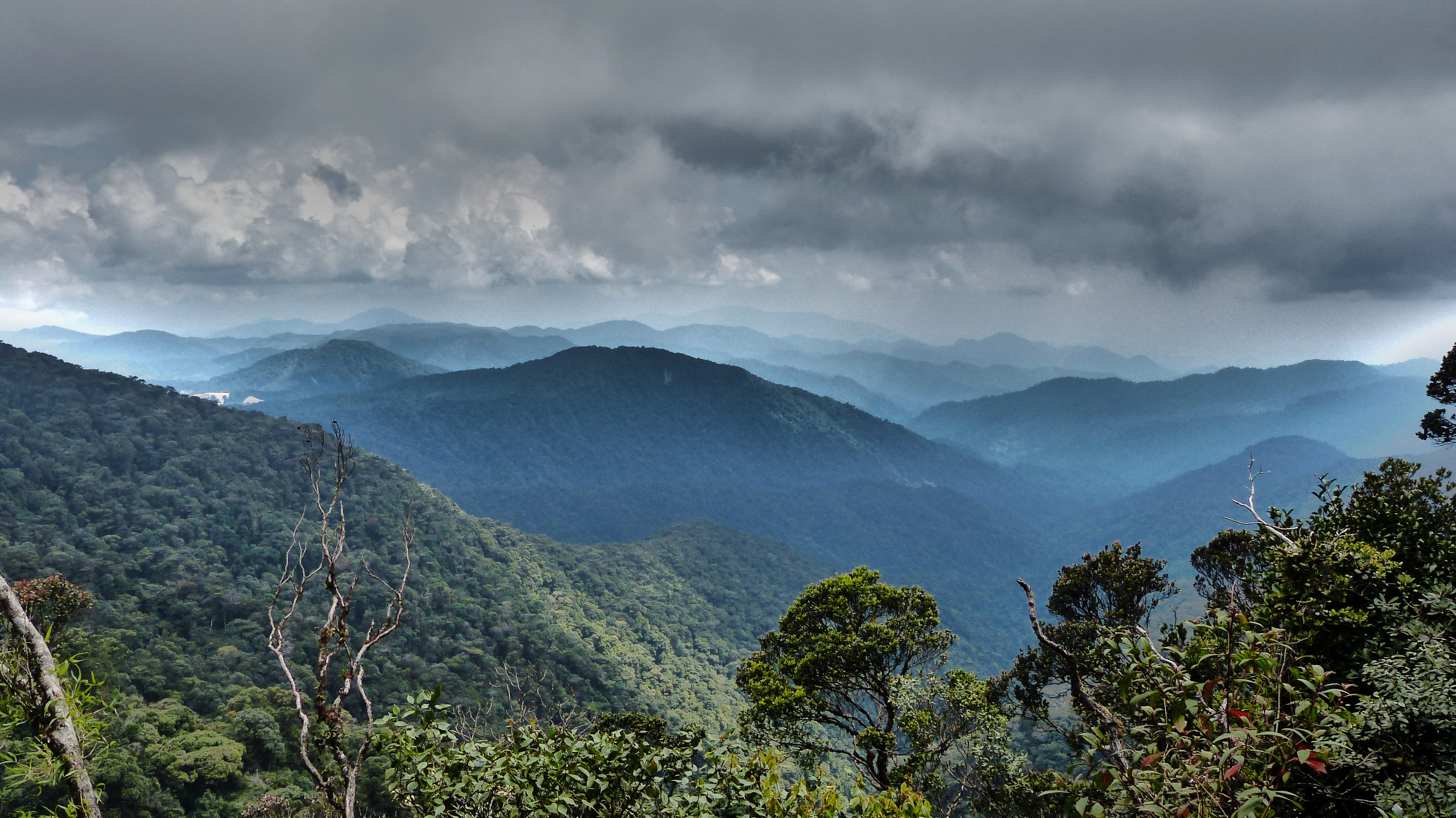
The Titiwangsa Mountains in Cameron Highlands, Pahang

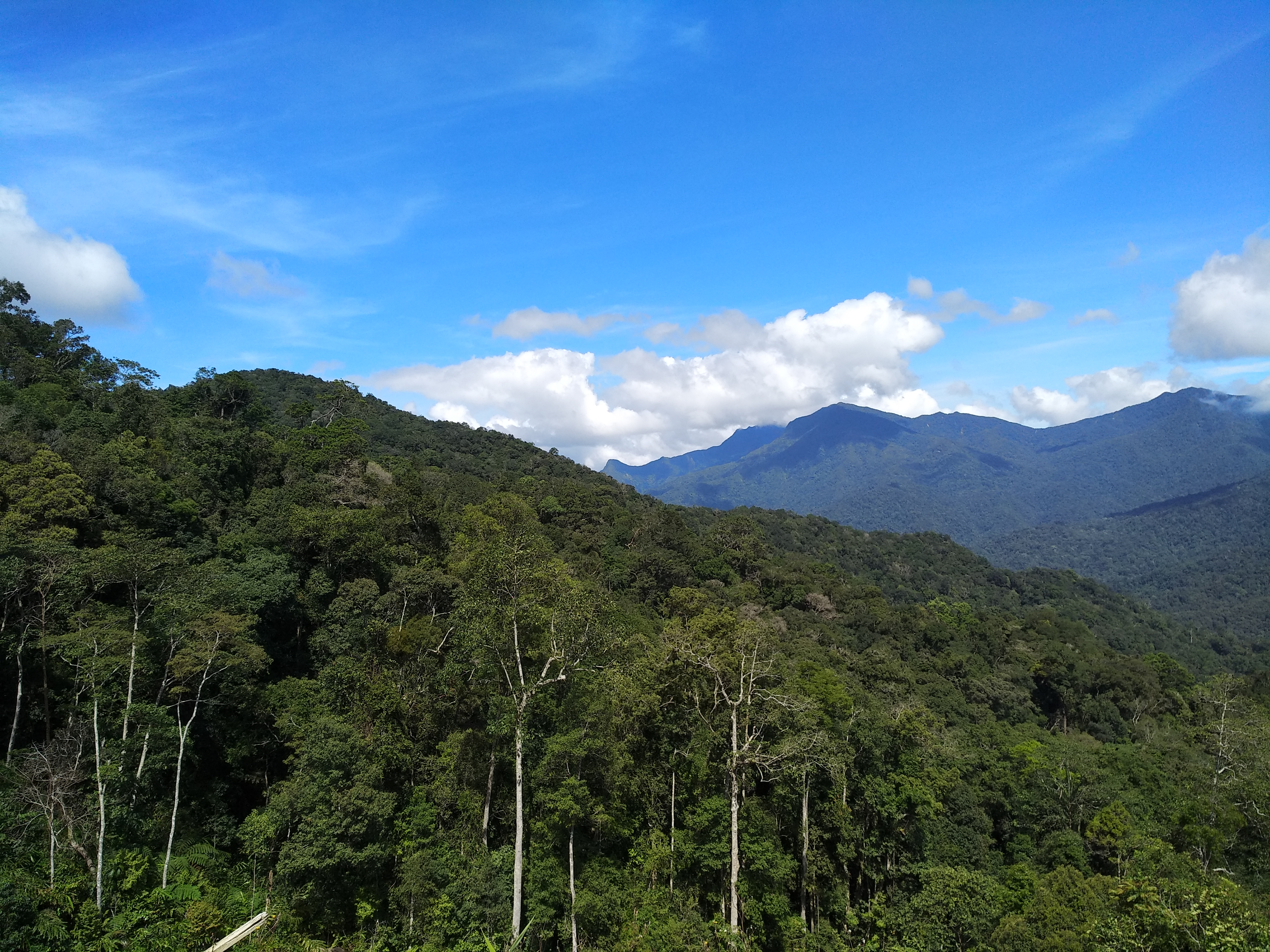
Untouched tropical rainforest between Mts. Suku and Yong Belar, near the tripoint between Perak, Kelantan and Pahang

== Patches and roads ==
The Titiwangsa Forest Complex comprises the following patches which are divided by roads running from East to West across the range:

- Greater Belum Forest Patch

Lebuhraya Timur–Barat (Malaysia Federal Route 4)

- Greater Gunung Korbu Forest Patch

Lebuhraya Timur–Barat Kedua (Malaysia Federal Route 185)

- Greater Cameron Highlands Forest Patch

Jalan Tapah–Cameron Highlands (Malaysia Federal Route 59)
Jalan Ringlet–Sungai Koyan (Malaysia Federal Route 102)
Jalan Kuala Kubu Bharu–Raub (Malaysia Federal Route 55)

- Greater Fraser's Hill Forest Patch

Kuala Lumpur–Karak Expressway (Malaysia Federal Route 2, 68, E8)

- Greater Gunung Nuang Forest Patch

Lebuhraya Temiang–Pantai (Malaysia Federal Route 366)
Jalan Seremban–Simpang Pertang (Malaysia Federal Route 86)

- Greater Berembun Forest Patch

Jalan Seremban–Kuala Pilah (Malaysia Federal Route 51)

- Greater Angsi Forest Patch

Jalan Rembau–Johol (Negeri Sembilan State Route N14)

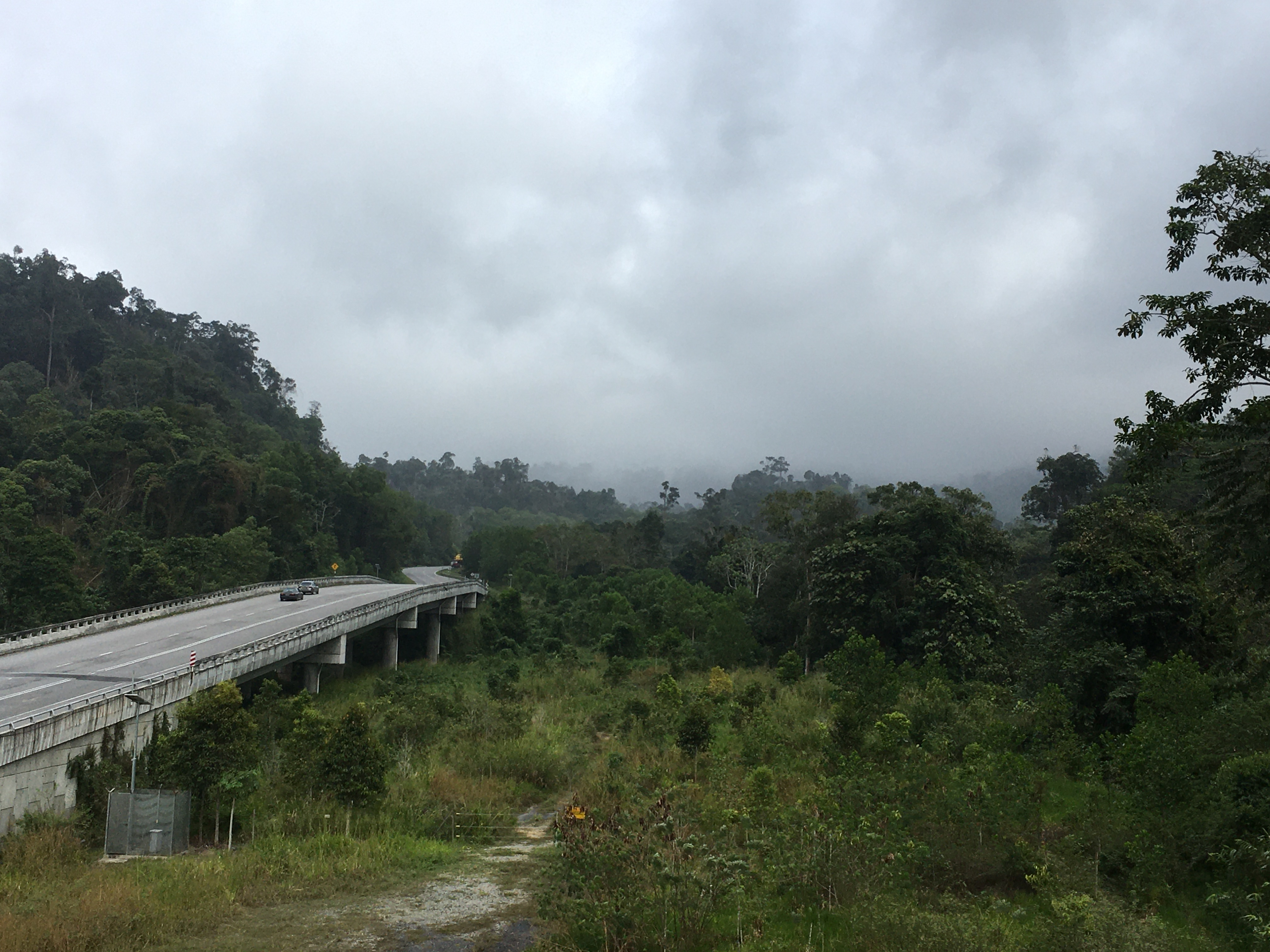
Federal Route FT 4 near Temenggor, Perak

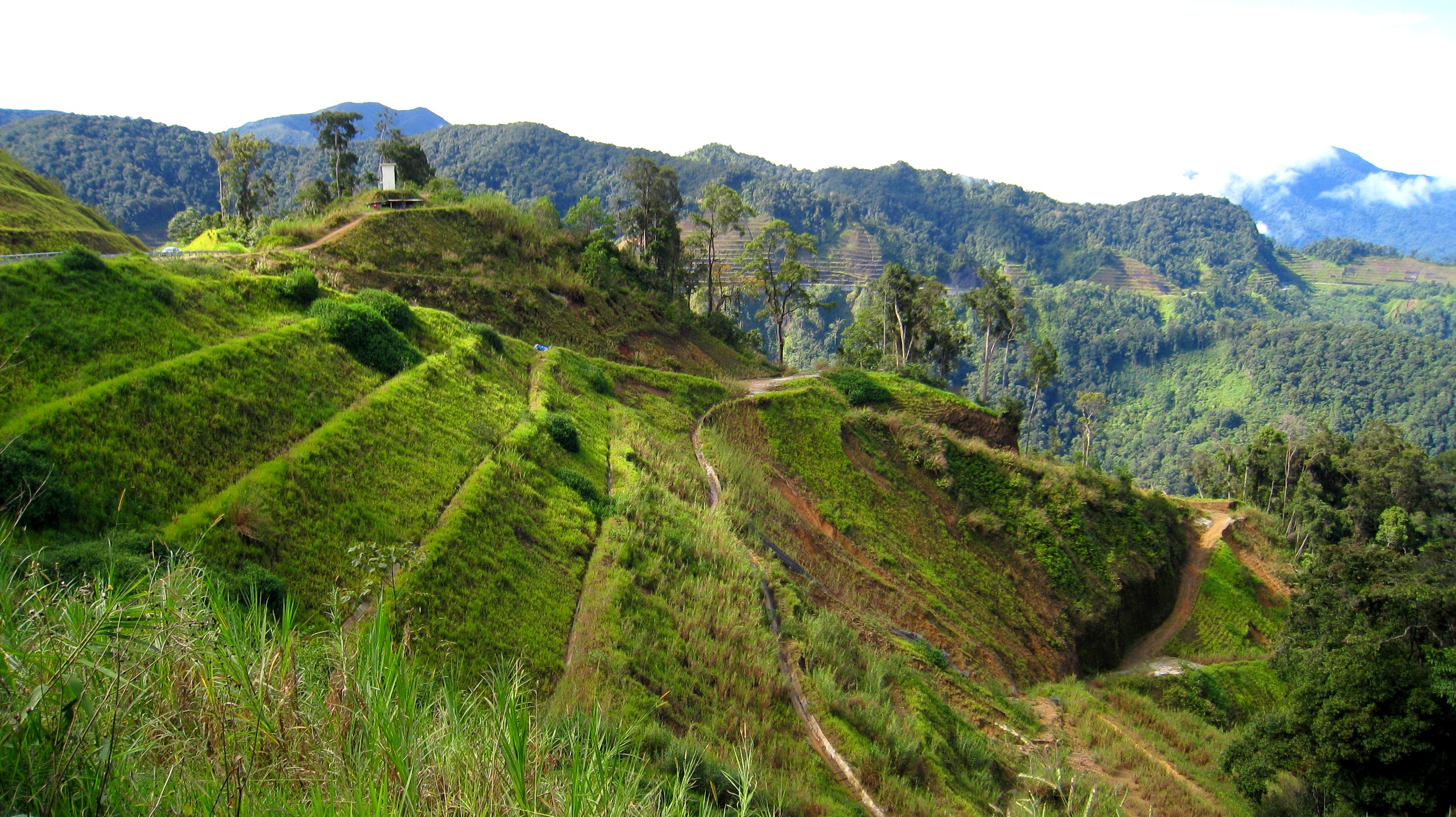
Federal Route FT 185 winding up the mountains near Simpang Pulai, Perak

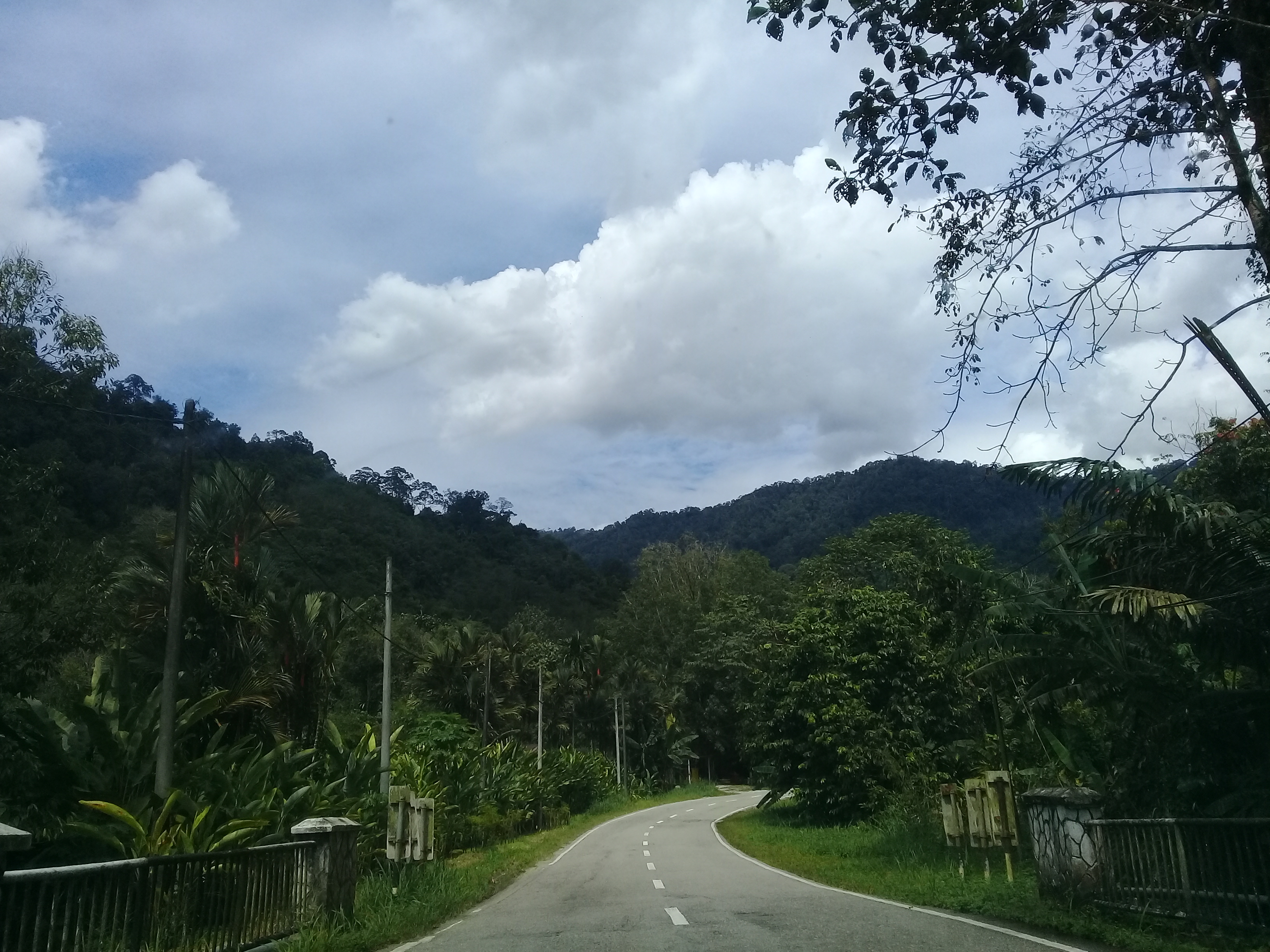
Federal Route FT 59 near Tapah, Perak, eastbound towards Ringlet, Pahang

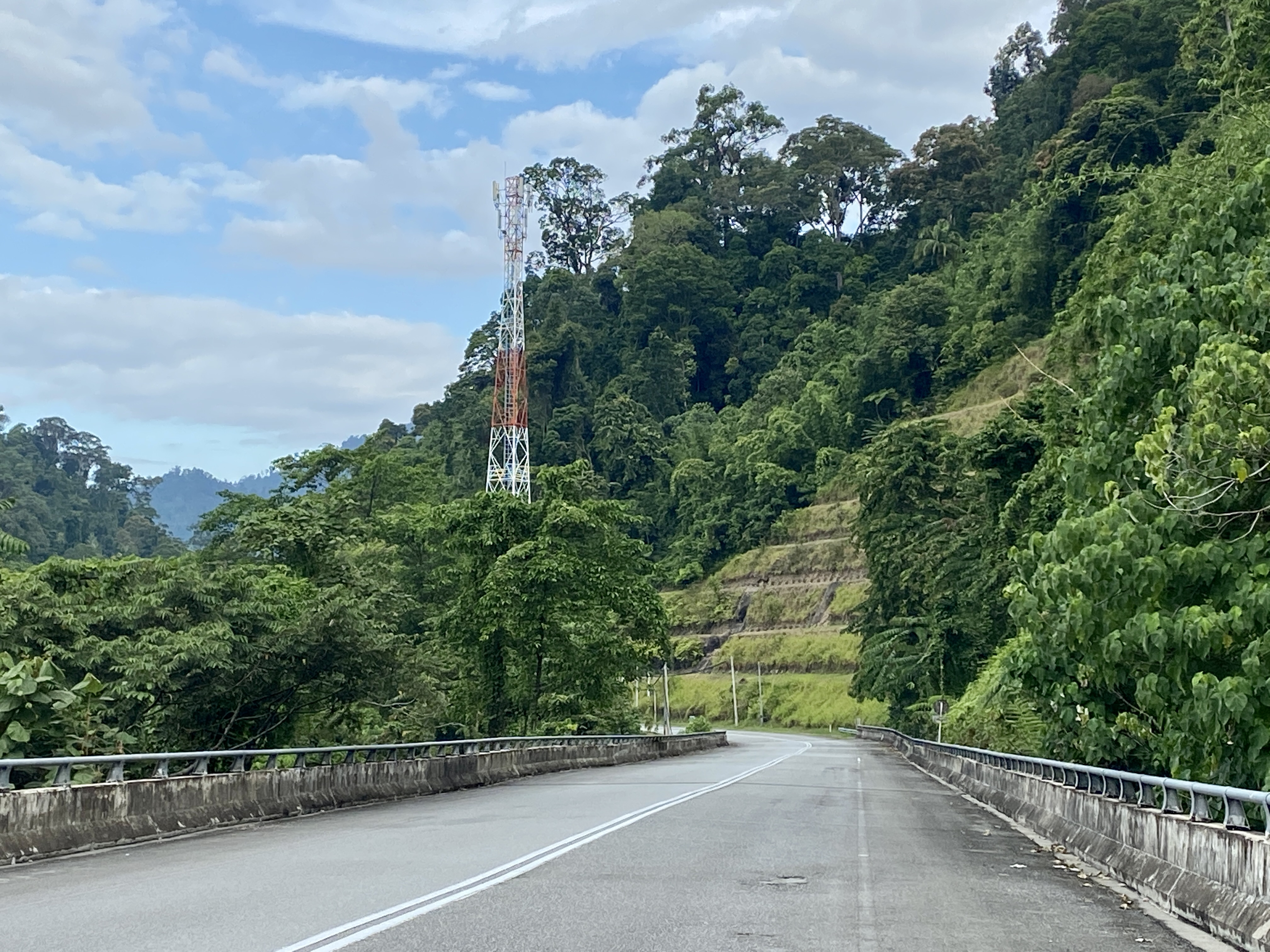
Federal Route FT 102 near Ulu Jelai, Pahang, eastbound towards Sungai Koyan. Along with FT 59, it forms a connection between Tapah in the west and Sungai Koyan in the east.

Federal Route FT 55 near the border between Selangor and Pahang at Fraser's Hill

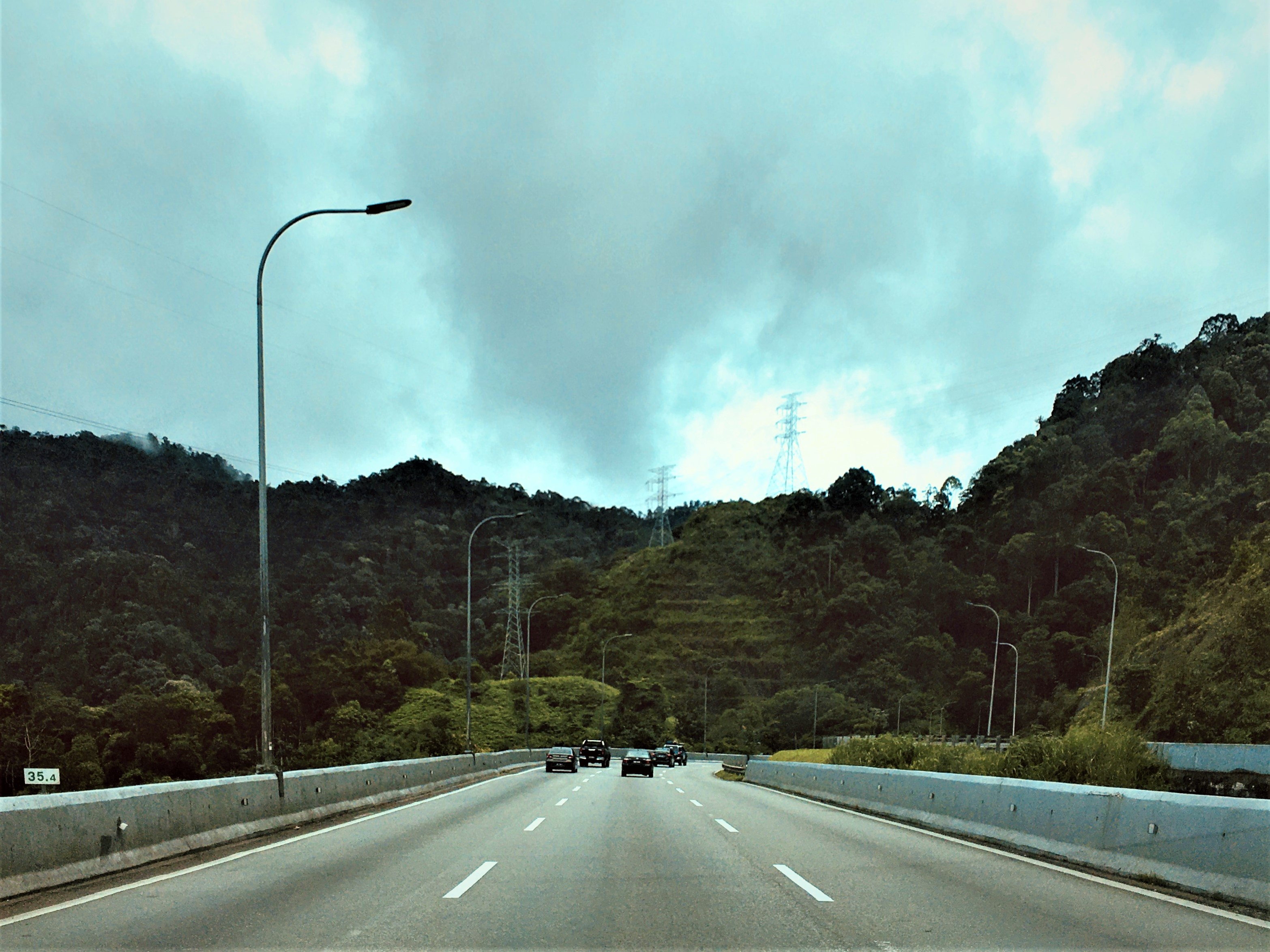
The Kuala Lumpur-Karak Highway near Genting Sempah, towards the border between Selangor and Pahang

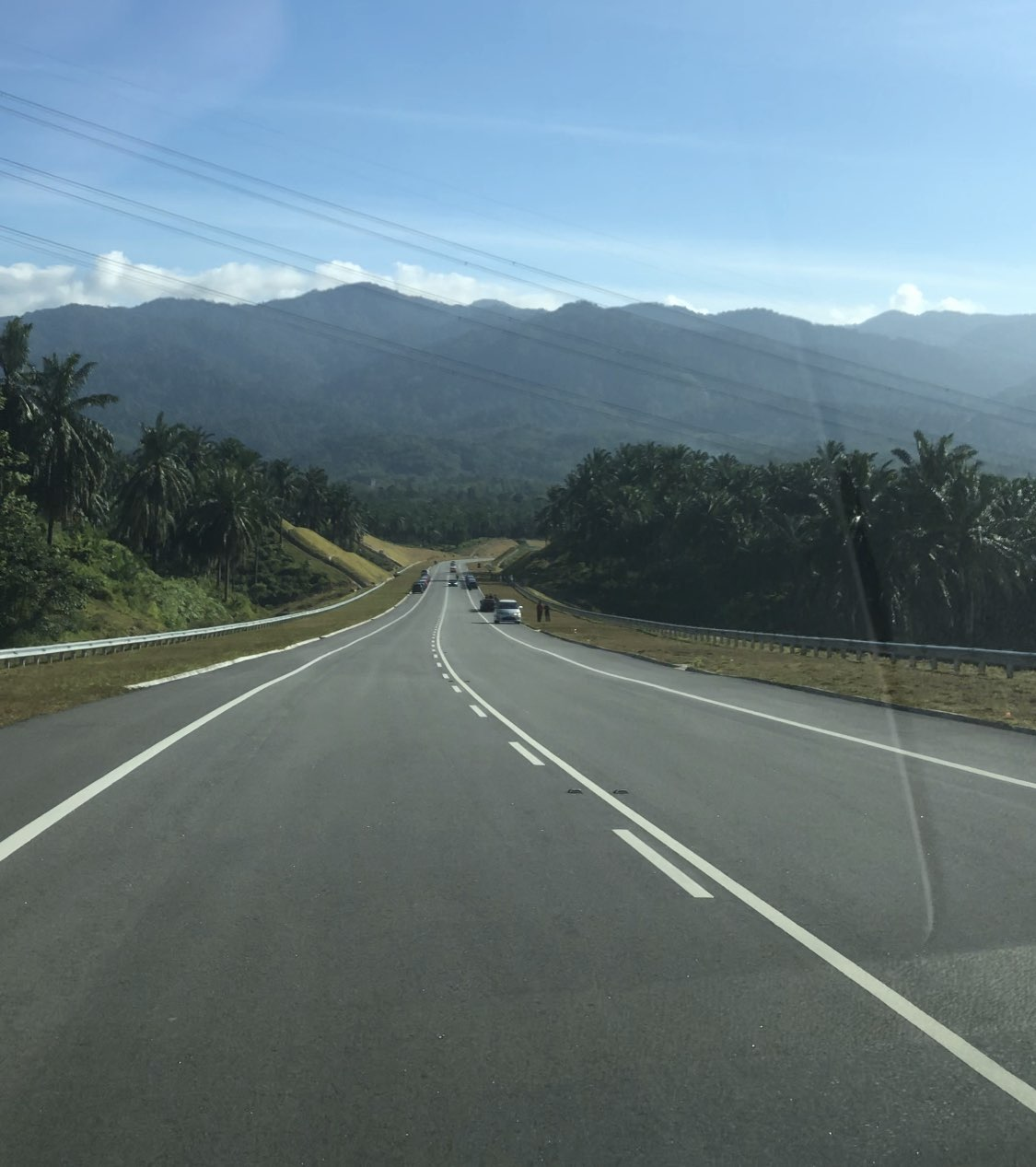
The Temiang-Pantai Highway near Pantai, Negeri Sembilan, towards the intersection with Federal Route FT 86

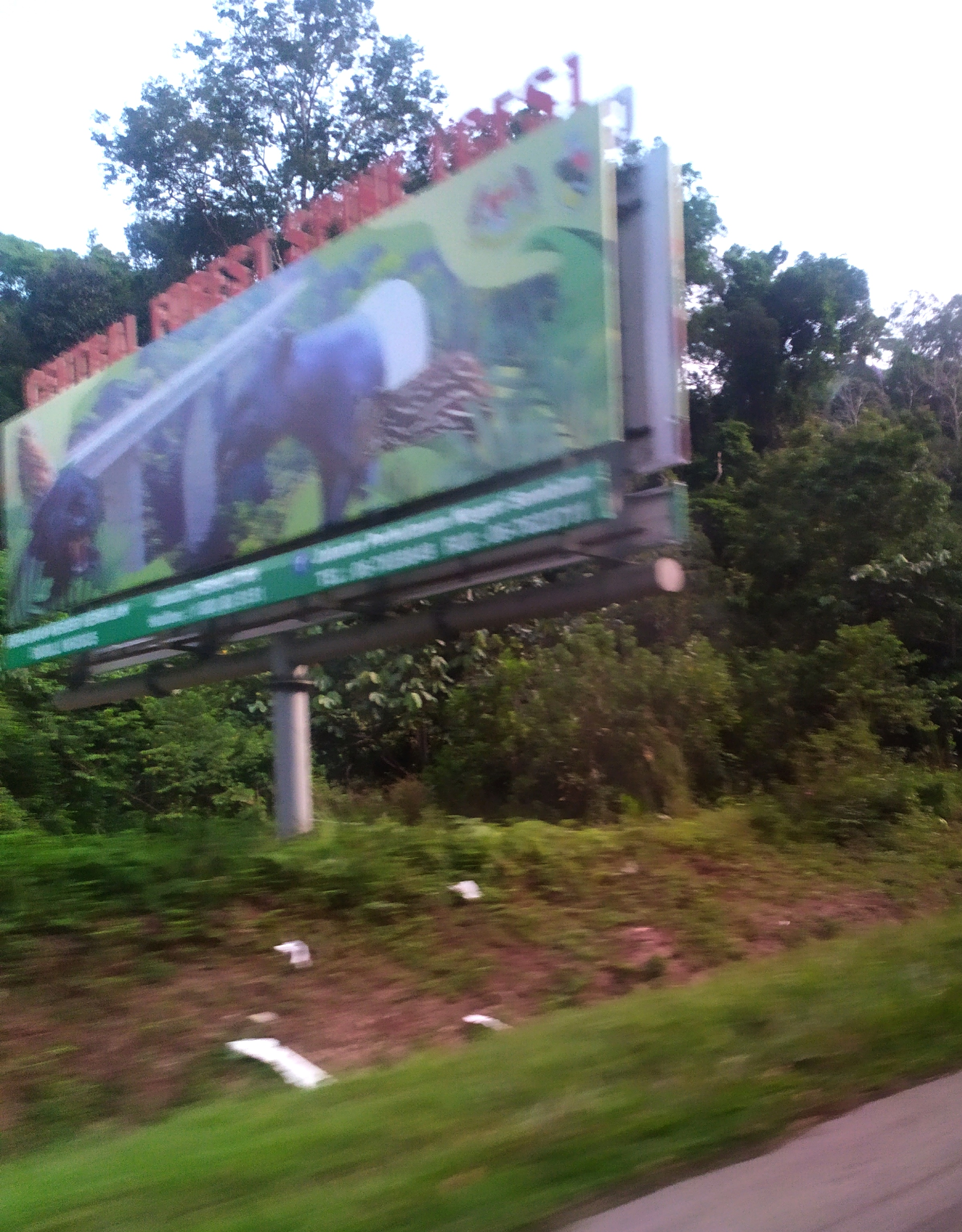
CFS signboard on Federal Route FT 51 in Bukit Putus, Negeri Sembilan

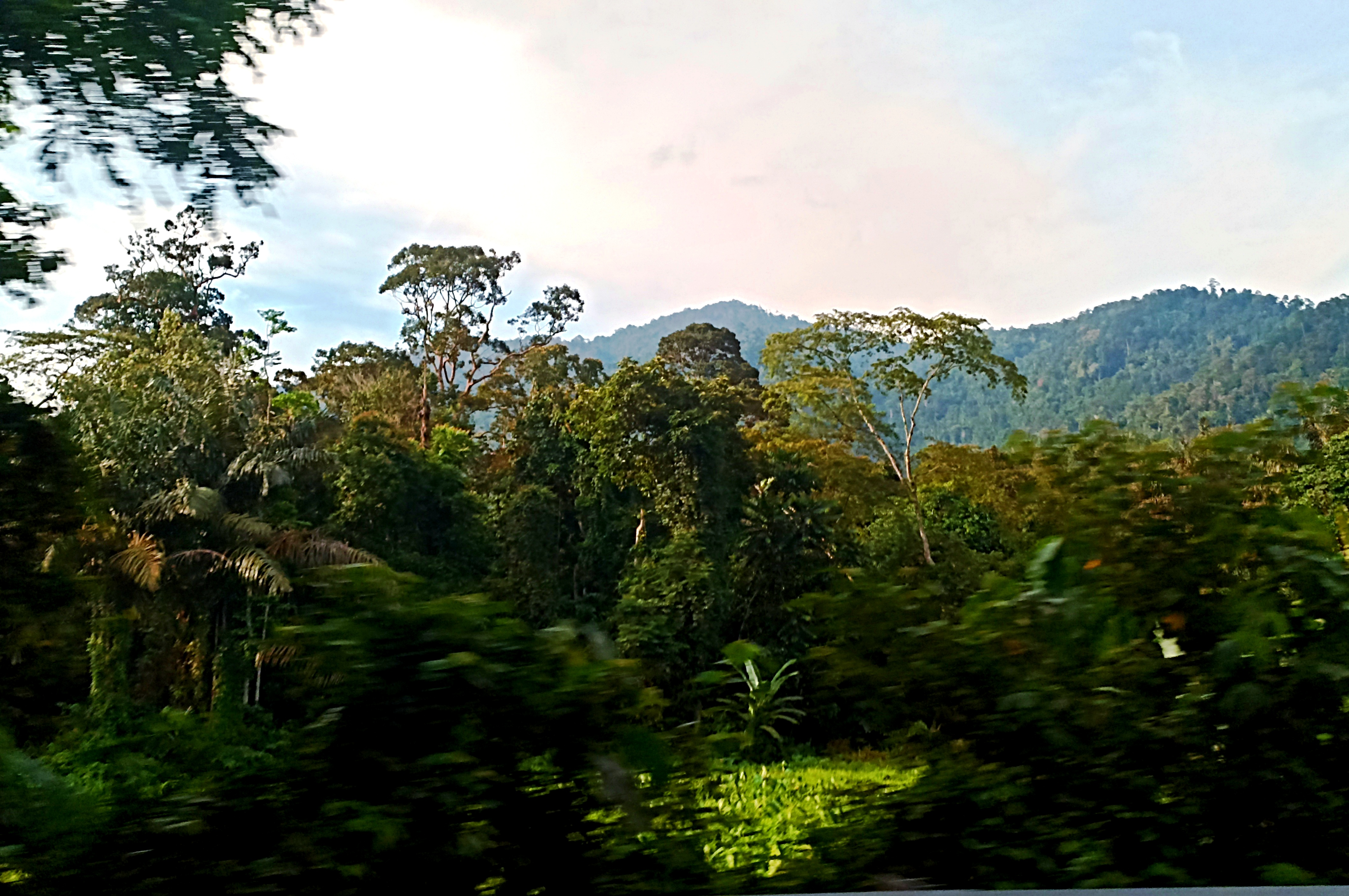
Tropical rainforest scenery along State Route N14, Bukit Miku, Negeri Sembilan
