= Negeri Sembilan State Route N24 =

Road in Malaysia

Negeri Sembilan Route 24
- Jalan Tanjung Ipoh–Senaling

Major junctions
- North end: Tanjung Ipoh
- FT 51 Federal Route 51; N29 State Route N29; N123 Jalan Ulu Inas; FT 9 Federal Route 9
- Southeast end: Senaling

Location
- Country: Malaysia
- Primary destinations: Seri Menanti, Tanjung Ipoh, Ulu Pilah, Senaling

Highway system
- Highways in Malaysia; Expressways; Federal; State

Jalan Tanjung Ipoh–Senaling, Negeri Sembilan State Route N24 is a major road in Negeri Sembilan, Malaysia. It is one of two roads that leads to Seri Menanti, the other being N29 Jalan Terachi-Seri Menanti. Unlike the N29, this road continues on from Seri Menanti to Ulu Pilah, ending at Senaling, meeting with the FT9 Federal Route 9.

== Junction lists ==
The entire route is located in Kuala Pilah District, Negeri Sembilan.

Legend:

- I/C - Interchange, I/S - Intersection, RSA - Rest and service area, OBR - Overhead bridge restaurant, R/R - Restaurant and rest plaza, L/B - Layby, V/P - Vista point, TN - tunnel, T/P - Toll plaza, BR - Bridge
- C - Cloverleaf, S - Stack, T-A - Trumpet-A, T-B - Trumpet-B, DT - Directional-T/Y, SDT - Semi-Directional-T/Y, P-Y - Partial-Y, D - Diamond, P-C - Partial cloverleaf, D-D - Diverging diamond, D-R - Direct ramp

Location	km	mi	Name	Destinations	Notes
Tanjung Ipoh			Tanjung Ipoh	FT 51 Malaysia Federal Route 51 – Seremban, Kuala Lumpur, Ulu Bendol Recreation Area, Kuala Pilah	T-junctions
Tanjung Ipoh			Kampung Tanjung Ipoh		
Tanjung Ipoh			Kampung Perigi Jerneh		
Seri Menanti			Kampung Pulau		
Seri Menanti			Kampung Panglang		
Seri Menanti			Kampung Tengah		
Seri Menanti			Kampung Ampang Batu		
Seri Menanti			Sungai Seri Menanti bridge		
Seri Menanti			Kampung Tanjung Beringin		
Seri Menanti			Jalan Terachi–Seri Menanti	N29 Negeri Sembilan State Route N29 – Terachi, Seremban, Kuala Lumpur, Ulu Bendol Recreation Area	T-junctions
Seri Menanti			Seri Menanti Royal Arch		
Seri Menanti			Seri Menanti Royal Mausoleum		
Seri Menanti			Tuanku Munawir Royal Mosque		
Seri Menanti			Jalan Tanah Datar	Jalan Tanah Datar – Tanah Datar, Batu Melintang	T-junctions
Seri Menanti			Seri Menanti Square		
Seri Menanti			Seri Menanti	Jalan Kampung Buyau – Kampung Buyau, Istana Baru Seri Menanti; Seri Menanti Old Palace – V	Roundabout
Seri Menanti			Kampung Batu Tempurong		
Seri Menanti			Kampung Galau		
Seri Menanti			Jalan Tanah Datar	Jalan Tanah Datar – Tanah Datar, Batu Melintang	T-junctions
Seri Menanti			Kampung Mertang	Kampung Mertang, Kampung Lumbang	T-junctions
Seri Menanti			Kampung Tanah Limau		
Seri Menanti			Kampung Sikai		
Seri Menanti			Kampung Gunung Pasir		
Ulu Pilah			Kampung Tanjung Pilah		
Ulu Pilah			Kampung Ulu Pilah		
Ulu Pilah			Kampung Pilah Tengah		
Ulu Pilah			Kampung Bukit		
Ulu Pilah			Kampung Gachong		
Ulu Pilah			Kampung Tanah Melintang		
Senaling			Kampung Cheriau		
Senaling			Kampung Peraku Seberang		
Senaling			Kampung Batang Pilah	N123 Jalan Ulu Inas – Inas, Rembau, Johol	T-junctions
Senaling			Senaling	FT 9 Malaysia Federal Route 9 – Kuala Pilah, Juasseh, Bahau, Kuantan, Johol, Tampin, Malacca	T-junctions
1.000 mi = 1.609 km; 1.000 km = 0.621 mi
