= Ampang Tinggi =

Town in Kuala Pilah District, Malaysia

Coordinates: 2°44′21″N 102°12′43″E

Ampang Tinggi in Kuala Pilah District

Ampang Tinggi (Malay for "high dam", Jawi: امڤاڠ تيڠڬي) is a small town and mukim in Kuala Pilah District, Malaysia. It is about 4 kilometres from the heart of the Kuala Pilah town centre. It is home to the Istana Ampang Tinggi built in 1865.

== Transportation ==
The town is served by N3 Jalan Ampang Tinggi, which links the town to Tanjung Ipoh Federal Route 51 and Kuala Pilah town centre.
