= Malaysia Federal Route 51 =

Road in Malaysia

Federal Route 51

Route information
- Maintained by Malaysian Public Works Department
- Length: 36.26 km (22.53 mi)

Major junctions
- West end: Seremban
- FT 1 Federal Route 1 Seremban Inner Ring Road; FT 86 Federal Route 86; FT 97 Jalan Senawang–Paroi; Kajang–Seremban Highway; FT 242 Persiaran Senawang 1 Jalan Lama Bukit Putus; FT 9 Federal Route 9
- East end: Kuala Pilah

Location
- Country: Malaysia
- Primary destinations: Senawang, Paroi, Ulu Bendol, Seri Menanti, Tanjung Ipoh, Ampang Tinggi, Kuala Pilah

Highway system
- Highways in Malaysia; Expressways; Federal; State

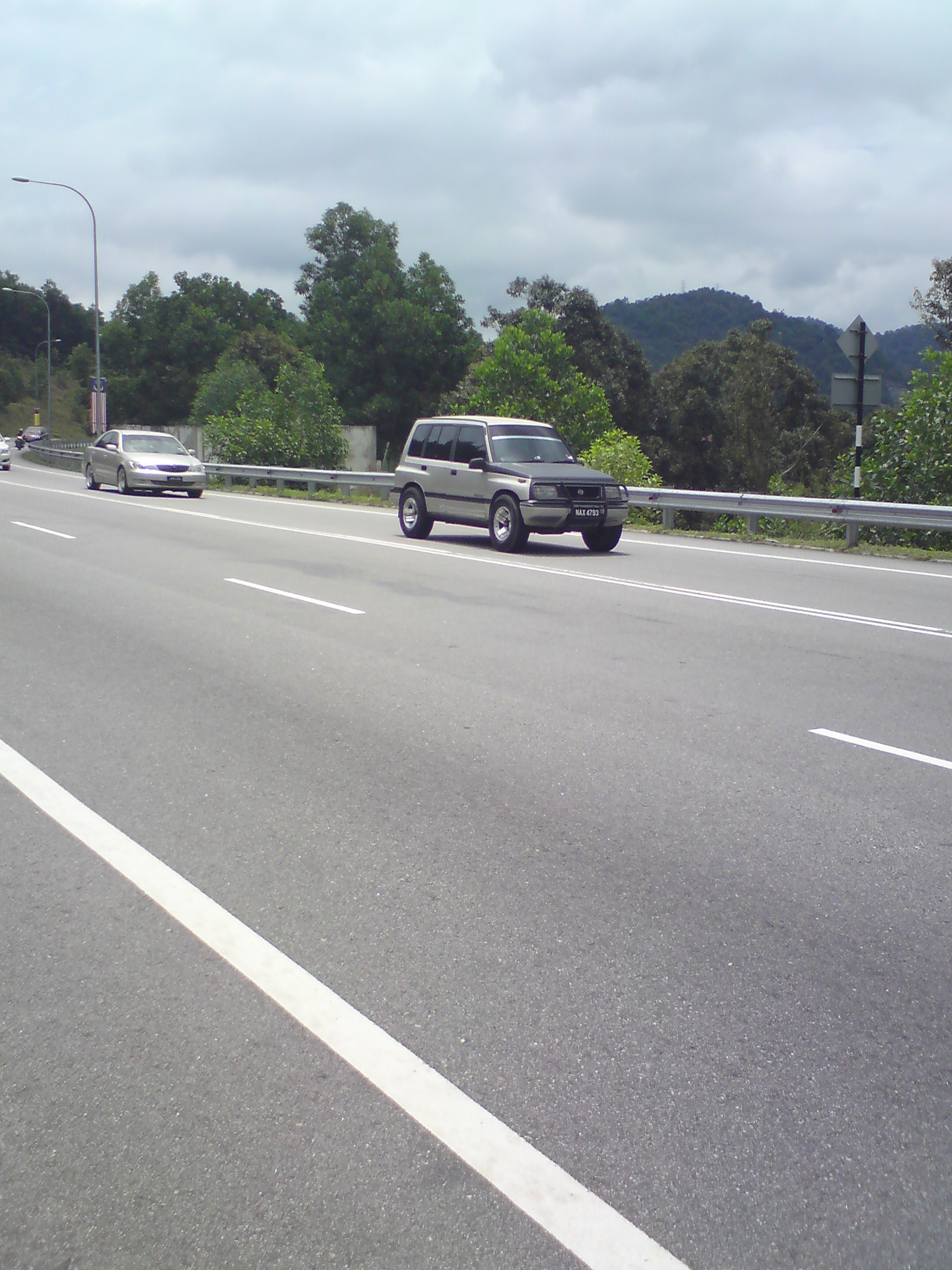
Climbing lanes are provided at the Bukit Putus new section of the Federal Route 51.

Jalan Seremban-Kuala Pilah or Federal Route 51 is the main federal road in Negeri Sembilan, Malaysia, connecting Seremban to Kuala Pilah. It is a relatively busy road in Negeri Sembilan.

== Route background ==
The Kilometre Zero of the Federal Route 51 is located at Seremban, at its interchange with the Federal Route 1, the main trunk road of the central of Peninsular Malaysia. The road then meets up with Federal Route 97 at Ampangan and Paroi. The Federal Route 51 then meets E21 Kajang–Seremban Highway and FT242 Persiaran Senawang 1 as a multi-level stack interchange. The road then cuts through the Titiwangsa Mountains at Bukit Putus, acting as a mountain pass, where the road splits into 2 with Jalan Lama Bukit Putus taking the old section and FT51 taking the new section of the road until Ulu Bendul.

After both roads meet up at Ulu Bendul, the road passes through Ulu Bendul, a protected nature reserve and trail along with a village with the same name. The road then becomes the backbone for serving Seri Menanti at N29 Terachi and N24 Tanjung Ipoh, and Ampang Tinggi. At the end of the Federal Route 51, the road meets FT9 Karak–Tampin Highway at the downtown of Kuala Pilah.

== History ==
The road was constructed by the British in the 1920s.

== Features ==
The 48-metre tall Bukit Putus Viaduct is the fourth highest bridge in Malaysia, behind Jalan Bukit Kukus Paired Road in Penang, Rawang Bypass in Selangor and Lojing Viaduct in Kelantan.

At most sections, the Federal Route 51 was built under the JKR R5 road standard, with a speed limit of 90 km/h.

There is one alternate route: Bukit Putus Bypass (Jalan Lama Bukit Putus).

== Bukit Putus section replacement bypass ==
The section of the Federal Route 51 from Paroi to Ulu Bendul known as Jalan Bukit Putus is notorious for its narrow and dangerous sharp corners. Construction of the new 6.7 km bypass including Bukit Putus Viaduct replacing the old narrow road started in 2006 and was completed in early 2009. In November 2009 the bypass was opened to traffic. The old route was re-gazetted as the Jalan Lama Bukit Putus.

== Junction lists ==
The entire route is located in Negeri Sembilan.

District	Location	km	mi	Name	Destinations	Notes
Seremban	Seremban	0.0	0.0	Seremban	FT 1 Malaysia Federal Route 1 – Kajang, Mantin, Senawang, Rembau, Port Dickson; North–South Expressway Southern Route / AH2 – Kuala Lumpur, Johor Bahru	Junctions
Seremban	Seremban			Rahang Besar		
Seremban	Ampangan			Ampangan-SIRR	Seremban Inner Ring Road – Mantin, Senawang, Port Dickson, Labu, Nilai; North–South Expressway Southern Route / AH2 – Kuala Lumpur. Johor Bahru	Diamond interchange
Seremban	Ampangan			Jalan Jelebu	FT 86 Malaysia Federal Route 86 – Kuala Klawang (Jelebu), Pertang	T-junctions
Seremban	Ampangan			Ampangan		
Seremban	Paroi			Jalan Senawang–Paroi	FT 97 Jalan Senawang–Paroi – Senawang	T-junctions
Seremban	Paroi			Paroi	Taman Paroi Jaya, Taman Pinggiran Golf, Paroi Sports Complex, Tuanku Abdul Rahman Stadium	
Seremban	Paroi			Jalan Tok Dagang	N101 Jalan Tok Dagang – Kuala Klawang	T-junctions
Seremban	Paroi			Jalan Senawang–Paroi and Kajang–Seremban Highway I/C	Kajang–Seremban Highway – Kajang, Mantin, Semenyih; FT 242 Persiaran Senawang 1 – Senawang, Rembau; North–South Expressway Southern Route / AH2 – Kuala Lumpur, Johor Bahru	Multi-level stack interchange
Seremban	Paroi			FAMA Fruit Plaza		
Seremban	Bukit Putus Viaduct			Old roads ---m above sea level	Jalan Lama Bukit Putus (Old Roads) – Bukit Putus	T-junctions
Seremban	Bukit Putus Viaduct	13.0	8.1	---m above sea level		
Seremban	Bukit Putus Viaduct			Bukit Putus Viaduct ---m above sea level		
Seremban	Bukit Putus Viaduct	14.0	8.7	–		
Seremban	Bukit Putus Viaduct			Bukit Putus Viaduct ---m above sea level		
Seremban	Bukit Putus Viaduct	16.0	9.9	290m above sea level		
Seremban–Kuala Pilah district border				300m above sea level		
Kuala Pilah	Ulu Bendol			Old roads 299m above sea level	Jalan Lama Bukit Putus (Old Roads) – Bukit Putus	T-junctions
Kuala Pilah	Ulu Bendol			Kuala Pilah welcome signs 298m above sea level		
Kuala Pilah	Ulu Bendol			Ulu Bendol Rest and Service Area		
Kuala Pilah	Ulu Bendol			Ulu Bendol Recreational Area		
Kuala Pilah	Ulu Bendol			Sungai Batang Terachi bridge		
Kuala Pilah	Ulu Bendol			Ulu Bendol Recreational Area	Ulu Bendol Recreational Area – Ulu Bendol Waterfalls, Ulu Bendol Snake Farm	T-junctions
Kuala Pilah	Ulu Bendol			Teratak Ulu Bendol		
Kuala Pilah	Ulu Bendol			Ulu Bendol Fishing Centre		
Kuala Pilah	Ulu Bendol			Kampung Bendol		
Kuala Pilah	Ulu Bendol			Kampung Ulu Bendol		
Kuala Pilah	Ulu Bendol			Kampung Sawah Liat		
Kuala Pilah	Ulu Bendol			Kampung Solok Paku		
Kuala Pilah	Ulu Bendol			Kampung Gedang		
Kuala Pilah	Ulu Bendol			Kampung Baharu Ulu Bendol		
Kuala Pilah	Ulu Bendol			Kampung Kundangan		
Kuala Pilah	Ulu Bendol			Kampung Pauh		
Kuala Pilah	Ulu Bendol			Ayer Sejok		
Kuala Pilah	Terachi			Jalan Terachi–Seri Menanti	Jalan Ayer Hitam – Kampung Ayer Hitam; N29 Negeri Sembilan State Route N29 – Seri Menanti, Seri Menanti Old Palace, Tuanku Munawir Royal Mosque, Seri Menanti Royal Mausoleum	Junctions
Kuala Pilah	Terachi			Terachi	Kampung Ibol	
Kuala Pilah	Tanjung Ipoh			Kampung Bukit		
Kuala Pilah	Tanjung Ipoh			Tanjung Ipoh	N135 Jalan Lubuk Kadam – Lubuk Kadam, Talang Tengah	T-junctions
Kuala Pilah	Tanjung Ipoh			Jalan Tanjung Ipoh–Senaling	N24 Negeri Sembilan State Route N24 – Senaling, Seri Menanti, Seri Menanti Old Palace, Tuanku Munawir Royal Mosque, Seri Menanti Royal Mausoleum	T-junctions
Kuala Pilah	Tanjung Ipoh			Kampung Kuala Serdang		
Kuala Pilah	Tanjung Ipoh			Sungai Seri Menanti Bridge		
Kuala Pilah	Kuala Pilah			Ampang Tinggi	N3 Jalan Ampang Tinggi – Kampung Kayu Ara, Kuala Pilah town centre, Bahau	T-junctions
Kuala Pilah	Kuala Pilah			Kampung Gemelang		
Kuala Pilah	Kuala Pilah			Kampung Gemuroh		
Kuala Pilah	Kuala Pilah			Hospital Tuanku Najihah, Kuala Pilah	Hospital Tuanku Najihah, Kuala Pilah	
Kuala Pilah	Kuala Pilah			Kuala Pilah	FT 9 Malaysia Federal Route 9 – Karak, Batu Kikir, Bahau, Kuantan, Bentong, Johol, Tampin, Gemas, Segamat, Alor Gajah, Malacca City	Junctions
1.000 mi = 1.609 km; 1.000 km = 0.621 mi

== Gallery ==
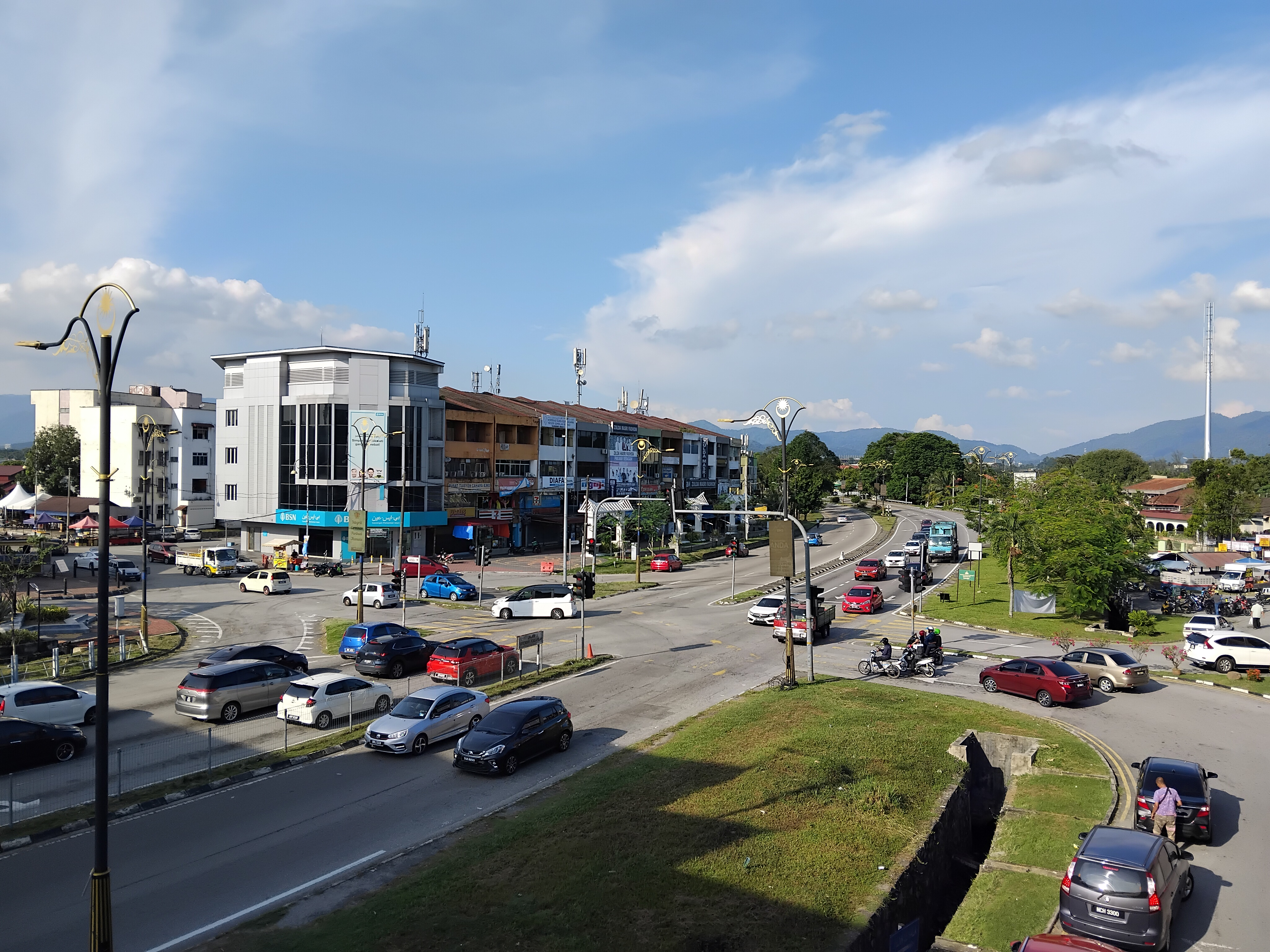
FT51 in Ampangan, with the Negri Titiwangsa in the background

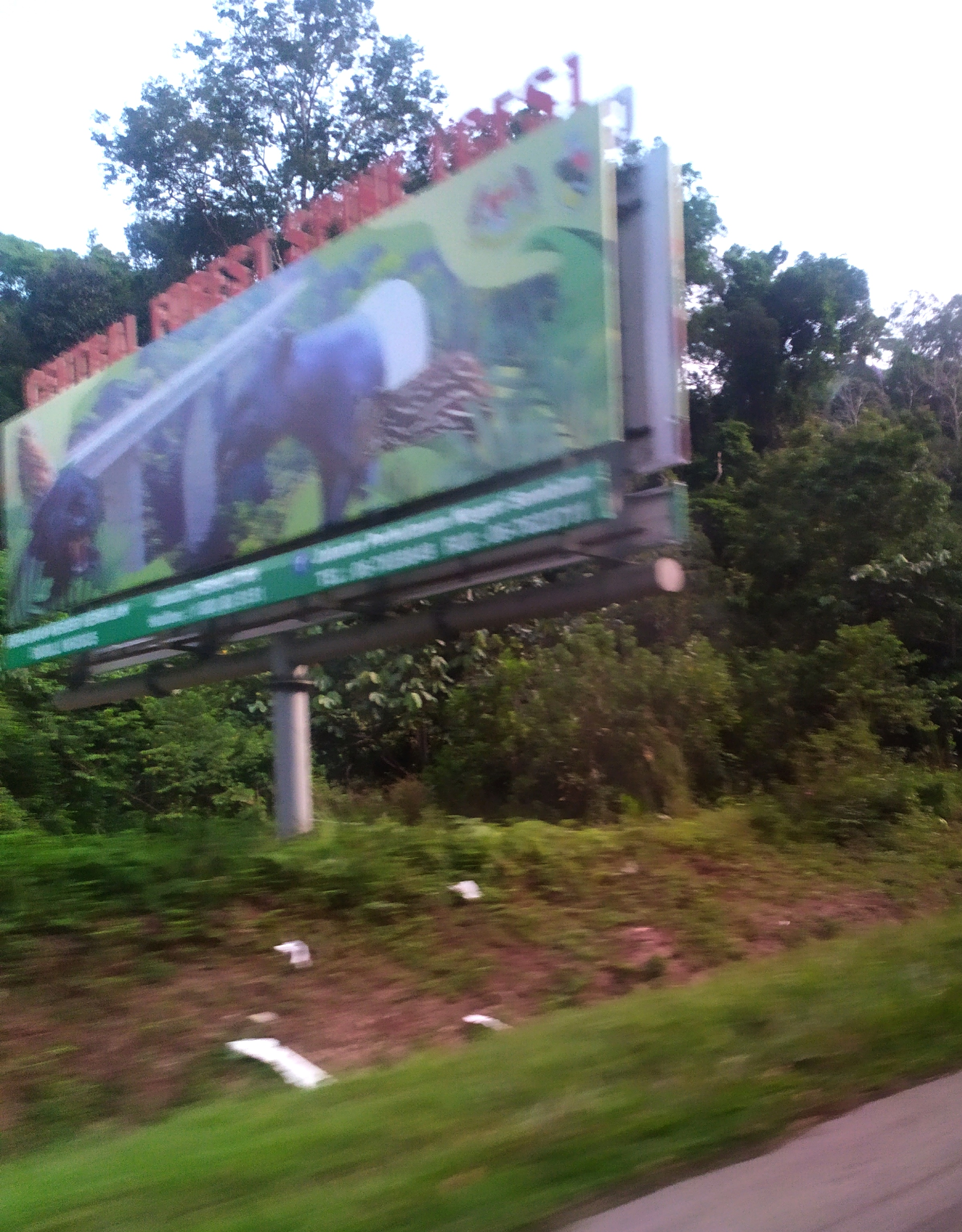
FT51 traverses through the Central Forest Spine's Titiwangsa Forest Complex near Bukit Putus on the Seremban–Kuala Pilah district boundary

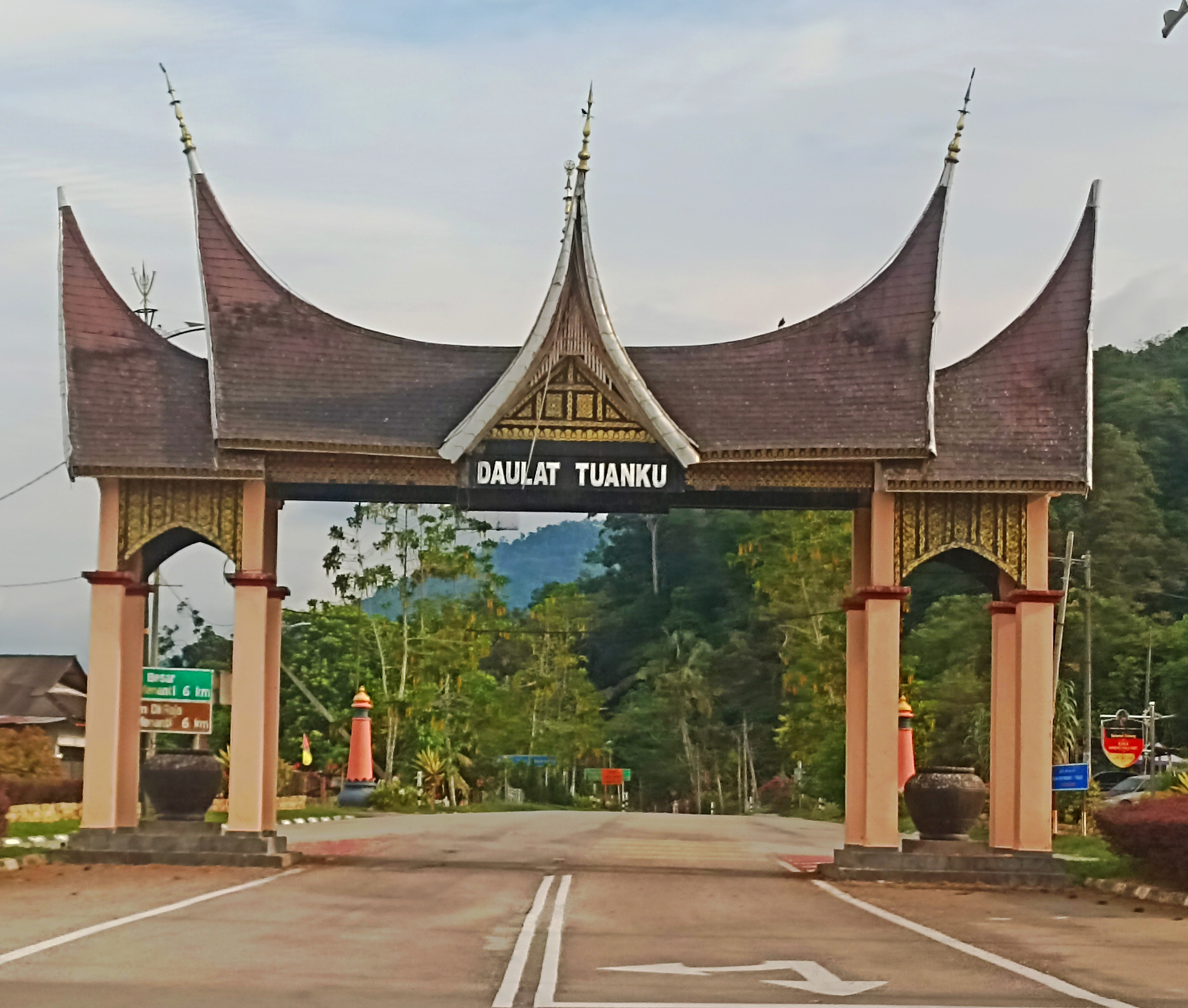
Minangkabau-styled arched gateway on the intersection between FT51 and State Route N29 leading to Seri Menanti, near Terachi

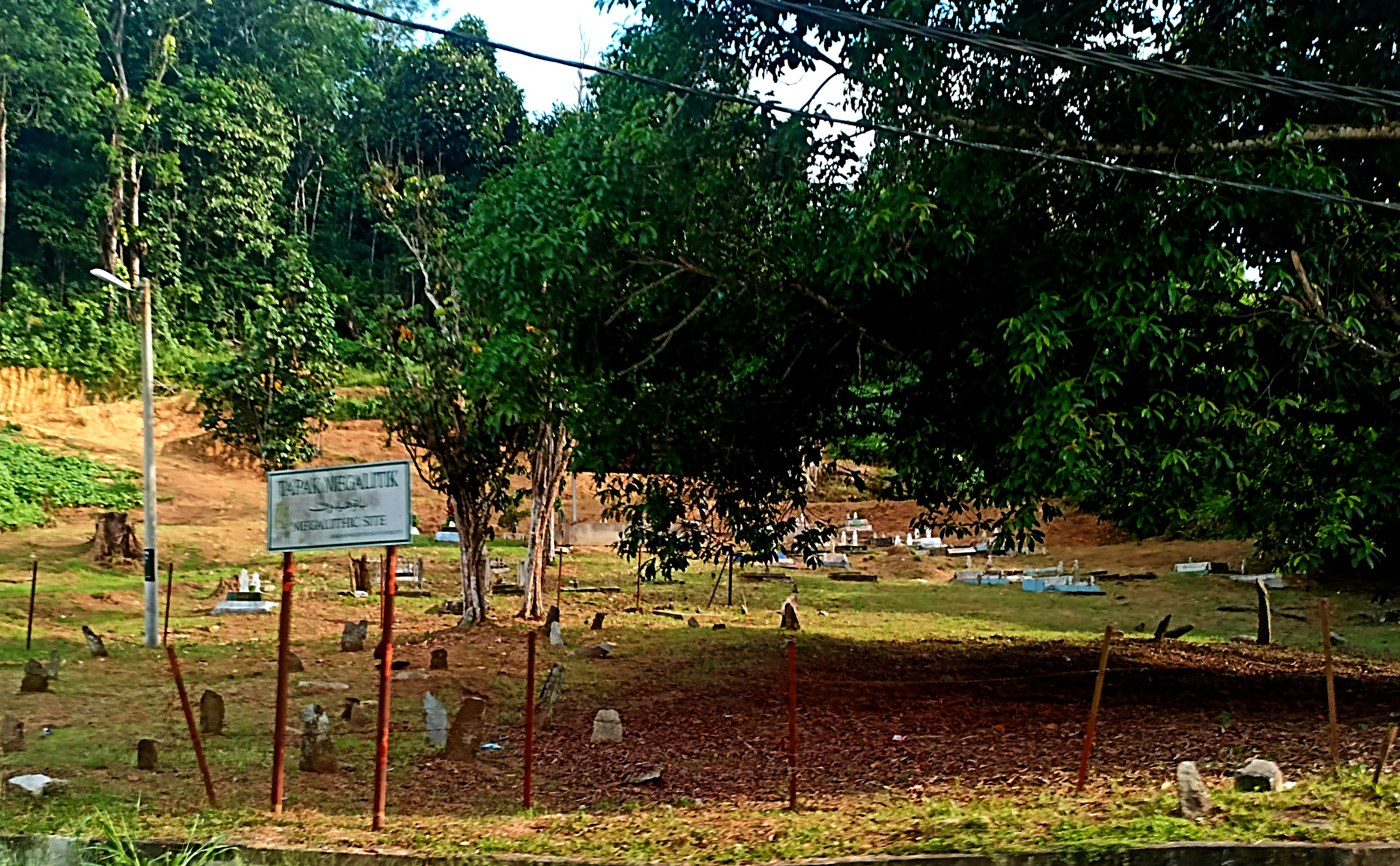
The Terachi section of FT51 is known for its megalithic sites

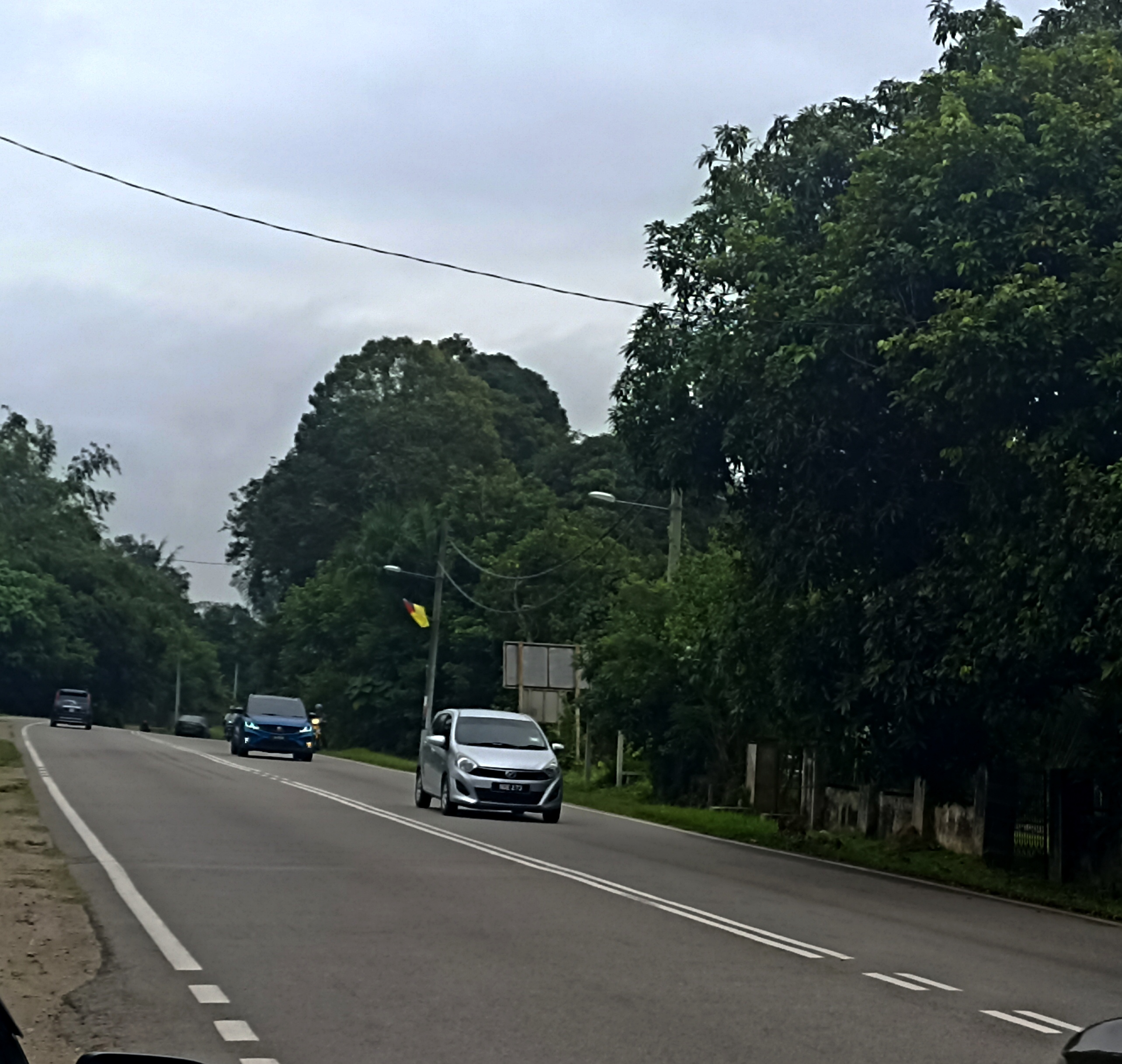
FT51 near Tanjung Ipoh
