= Jalan Lama Bukit Putus =

Road in Malaysia

Route information
- Length: 6.84 km (4.25 mi)

Major junctions
- West end: Paroi
- Federal Route 51
- East end: Ulu Bendul

Location
- Country: Malaysia
- Primary destinations: Bukit Putus

Highway system
- Highways in Malaysia; Expressways; Federal; State

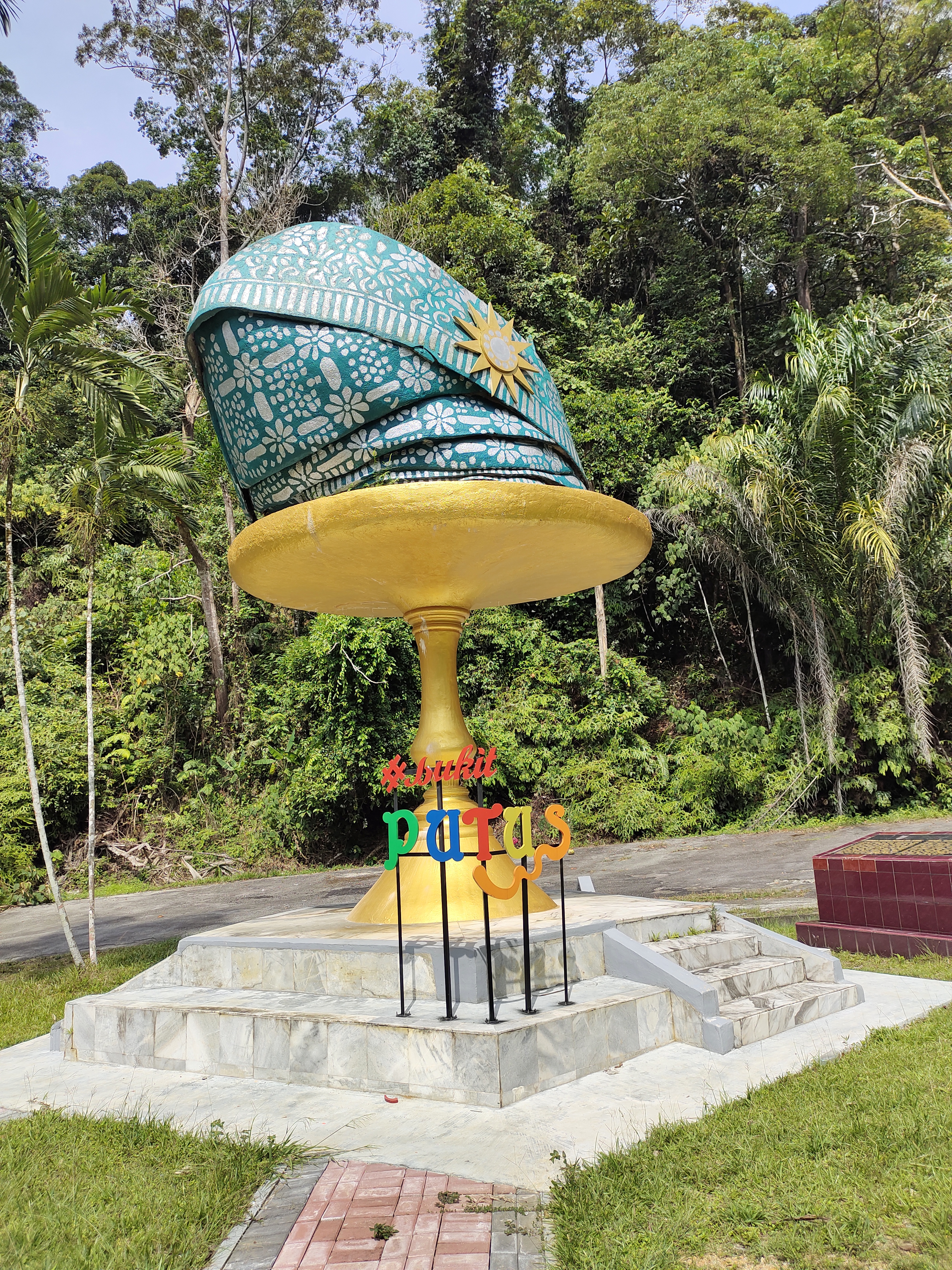
The Destar Dendam Tak Sudah monument marks the border between the districts of Seremban and Kuala Pilah along the route.

Jalan Lama Bukit Putus, formerly Federal Route 361 is a previous federal road in Negeri Sembilan, Malaysia passing through Bukit Putus in the Titiwangsa Mountains. This 7 km (4.3 mi) road was an old stretch of Federal Route 51 is notorious for its narrow and dangerous sharp corners, prior to its realignment in 2009.

== Route background ==
The road was constructed by British in the 1920s. In July 2014, the old stretch of the Bukit Putus (Federal Route 51) was redesignated as Federal Route 361.

Even though FT51 is safer, many people (especially cyclists) often use this road instead. This road is also home to a few attractions such as Starfresh Agro Park and a scout camp. There are hiking trails at Bukit Putus that can be accessed from this road, notably to Mount Angsi, the seventh highest point in Negeri Sembilan. Many people also consider using this road as an alternative whenever FT51 is experiencing congestion.

== Description ==
The Kilometre Zero is located at the junctions of FT51 at Bukit Putus (West). This stretch of the road was infamous for its winding section, sharp corners, and occasional landslides as it is located at the edge of a cliff known as Bukit Putus. Because of this, a less winding 6.7km piece of road on the Jalan Kuala Pilah was built to bypass the dangerous Bukit Putus section, which would lead to the construction of the fourth highest bridge in Malaysia, Bukit Putus Viaduct.

== Junction lists ==
The entire route is located in Negeri Sembilan.

Legend:

- I/C - Interchange, I/S - Intersection, RSA - Rest and service area, OBR - Overhead bridge restaurant, R/R - Restaurant and rest plaza, L/B - Layby, V/P - Vista point, TN - tunnel, T/P - Toll plaza, BR - Bridge
- C - Cloverleaf, S - Stack, T-A - Trumpet-A, T-B - Trumpet-B, DT - Directional-T/Y, SDT - Semi-Directional-T/Y, P-Y - Partial-Y, D - Diamond, P-C - Partial cloverleaf, D-D - Diverging diamond, D-R - Direct ramp

District	Location	km	mi	Name	Destinations	Notes
Seremban	Bukit Putus	0.0	0.0	Bukit Putus (West)	FT 51 Malaysia Federal Route 51 – Seremban, Paroi, , Seri Menanti, Kuala Pilah, Ulu Bendol Recreational Area; North–South Expressway Southern Route / AH2 – Kuala Lumpur, Johor Bahru; Kajang–Seremban Highway – Kajang, Kuala Lumpur	T-junctions
Seremban	Bukit Putus	1.0	0.62			
Seremban	Bukit Putus	5.0	3.1	Bukit Putus		
Seremban	Bukit Putus	6.0	3.7	290m above sea level		
Seremban-Kuala Pilah district border				300m above sea level		
Kuala Pilah	Ulu Bendul	7.0	4.3	Ulu Bendul; 299 m above sea level	FT 51 Malaysia Federal Route 51 – Seremban, Paroi, , Seri Menanti, Kuala Pilah, Ulu Bendol Recreational Area; North–South Expressway Southern Route / AH2 – Kuala Lumpur, Johor Bahru; Kajang–Seremban Highway – Kajang, Kuala Lumpur	T-junctions
1.000 mi = 1.609 km; 1.000 km = 0.621 mi
