= Istana Ampang Tinggi =

Former palace in Negeri Sembilan, Malaysia

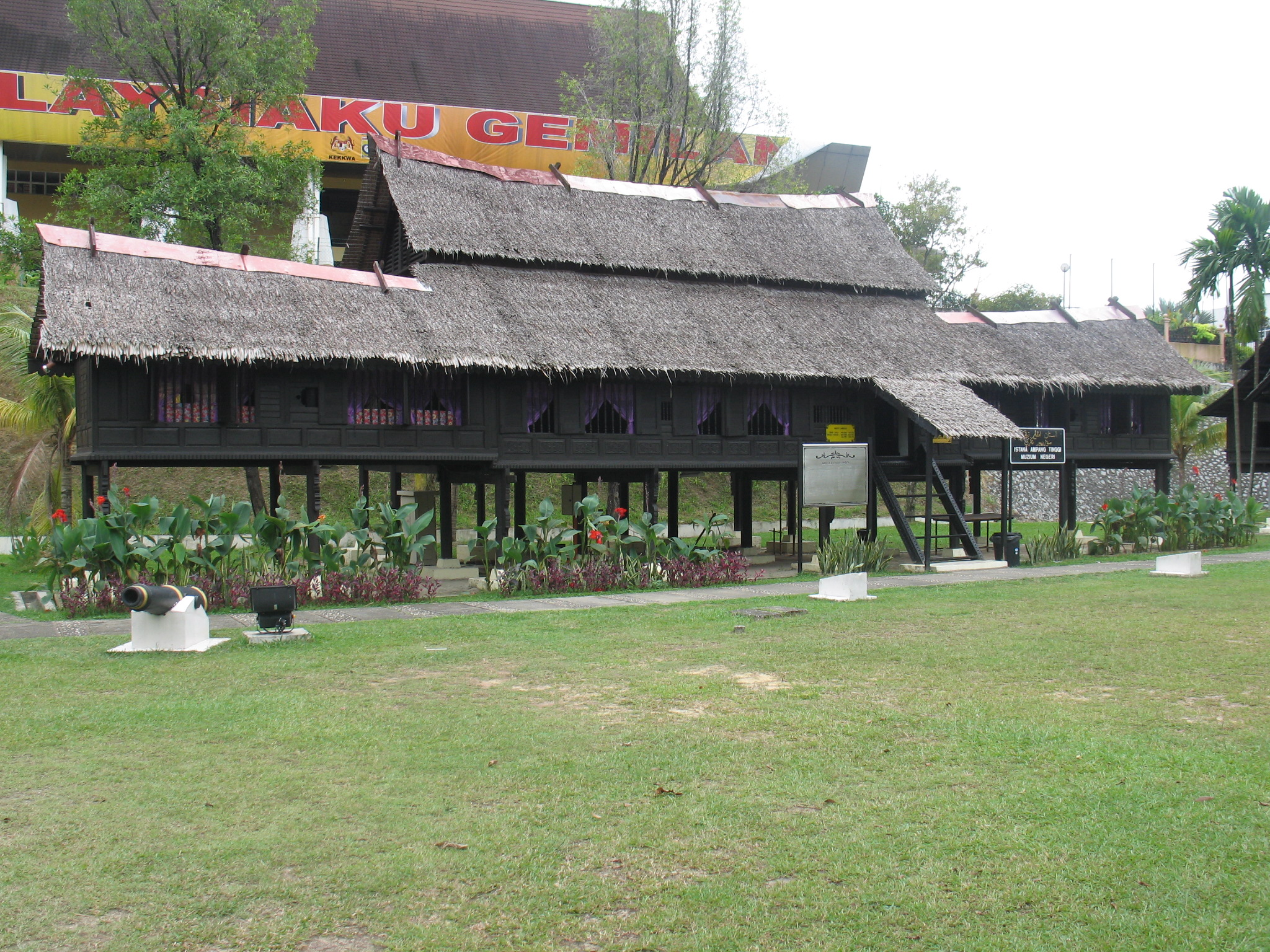

General information
- Location: Negeri Sembilan, Malaysia

The Istana Ampang Tinggi (Negeri Sembilan Malay: Istano Ampang Tinggi, Jawi: ايستان ام ڤاڠ تيڠڬي) was a royal residence in Negeri Sembilan in Malaysia.

The palace was built without using any nails. It has a length of 66.5 feet and a width of 23.5 feet. It was ordered by Yamtuan Imam, the 5th Yamtuan Besar of Negeri Sembilan. The palace was built between 1865 and 1870 at Ampang Tinggi in Kuala Pilah on a ridge overlooking a wide expanse of paddy fields.

When it was completed, the ruler gave it to his daughter Puteri Cindai, when she married Tengku Muda Chik, the son of the 4th Yamtuan, Yamtuan Radin. The palace stood six miles from Seri Menanti when, in 1953 the 8th Yamtuan, Tuanku Abdul Rahman gave permission for the palace to be dismantled and transported to its current location about three miles from Seremban. Today, it serves as a small museum containing weapons and other historical artefacts from Negeri Sembilan.
