= Bukit Putus, Negeri Sembilan =

Mountain pass in Negeri Sembilan, Malaysia

Bukit Putus
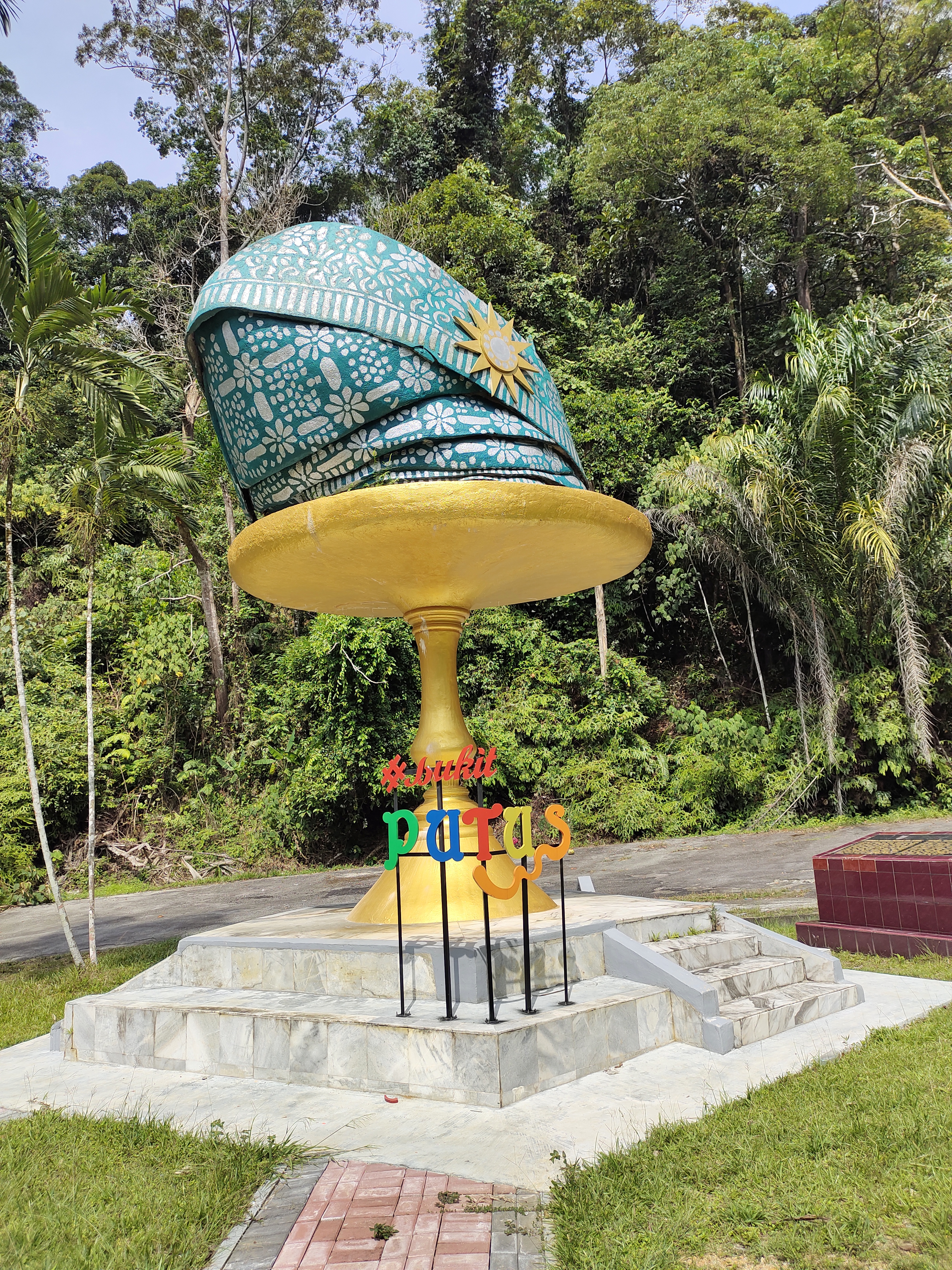
- The Destar Dendam Tak Sudah monument at the district border between Seremban and Kuala Pilah.
- Interactive map of Bukit Putus
- Elevation: 290 metres (950 ft)
- Traversed by: FT 51 Jalan Seremban–Kuala Pilah; FT 361 Jalan Lama Bukit Putus

Third Approach
- Location: Seremban and Kuala Pilah Districts, Negeri Sembilan, Malaysia
- Range: Titiwangsa Mountains
- Coordinates: 2°43′39″N 102°03′22″E

Bukit Putus (English: Broken Tail Hill, Negeri Sembilan Malay: Bukik Putuih) is a mountain pass situated on the boundary between Seremban dan Kuala Pilah Districts in the Malaysian state of Negeri Sembilan, sandwiched between the Telapak Buruk-Berembun massif and Mount Angsi of the Negri Titiwangsa. The mountain pass connects the Seremban suburb of Paroi in the west with Ulu Bendul in the east. It is one of the three principal passes that link western and eastern Negeri Sembilan, the other two being Bukit Tangga (Seremban–Jelebu) and Bukit Miku (Rembau–Kuala Pilah).

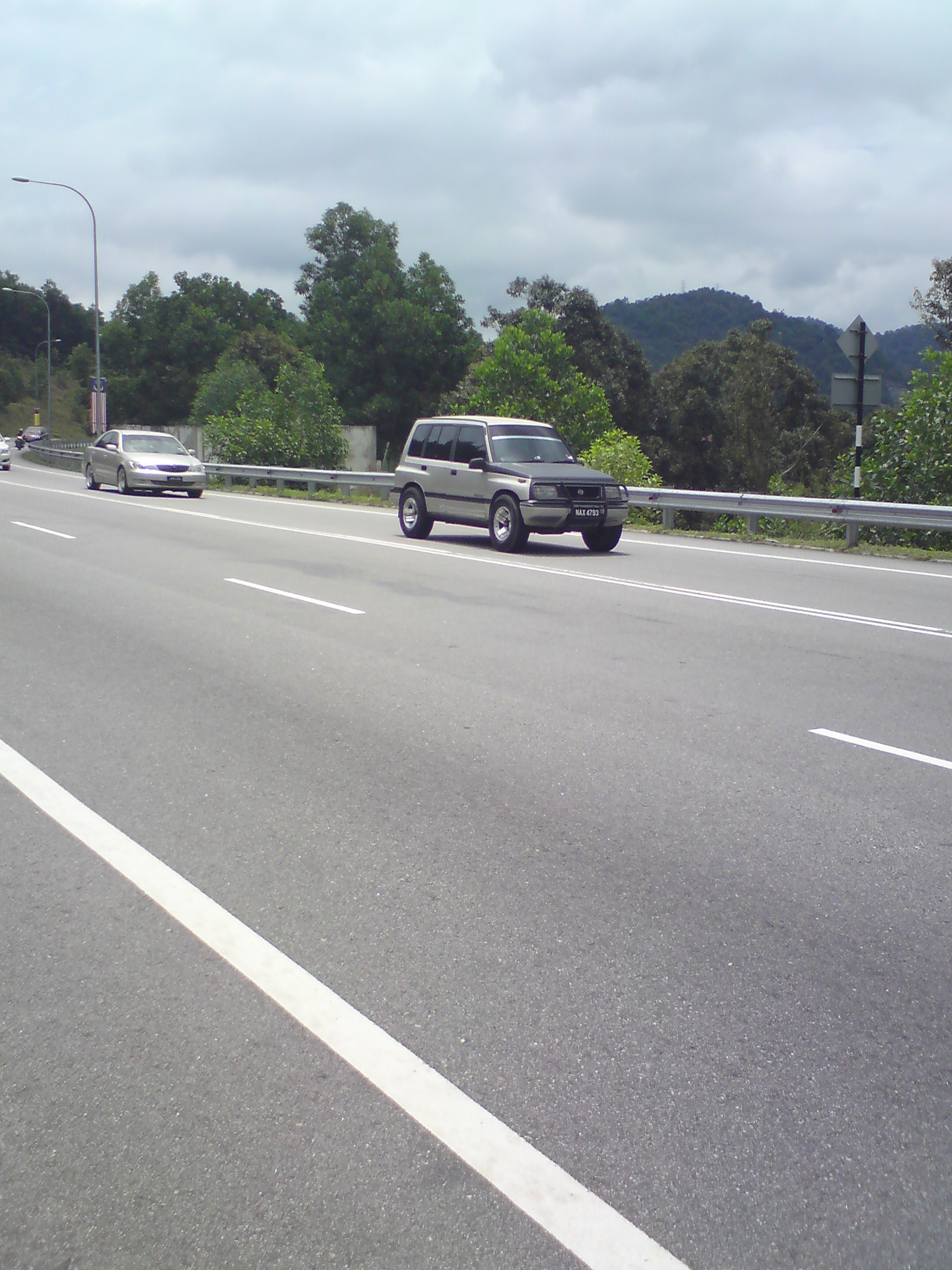
The Bukit Putus section of Federal Route 51 with climbing lane for Kuala Pilah-bound traffic.

Bukit Putus is traversed by two routes, namely Federal Route 51, the main artery that links the state capital, Seremban with Kuala Pilah; and Federal Route 361, the older, narrower and windier section of the former that was supplanted following the route's realignment since 2009. The Bukit Putus Viaduct, the fourth tallest bridge in Malaysia, carries a section of Federal Route 51 called Jalan Lama Bukit Putus.

== Etymology ==
Bukit Putus is, in English, Broken Tail Hill. This comes from an old mythological tale of two tigers that got into a fight here. One of the tigers lost its tail, which formed part of the landscape.

== Historical significance ==
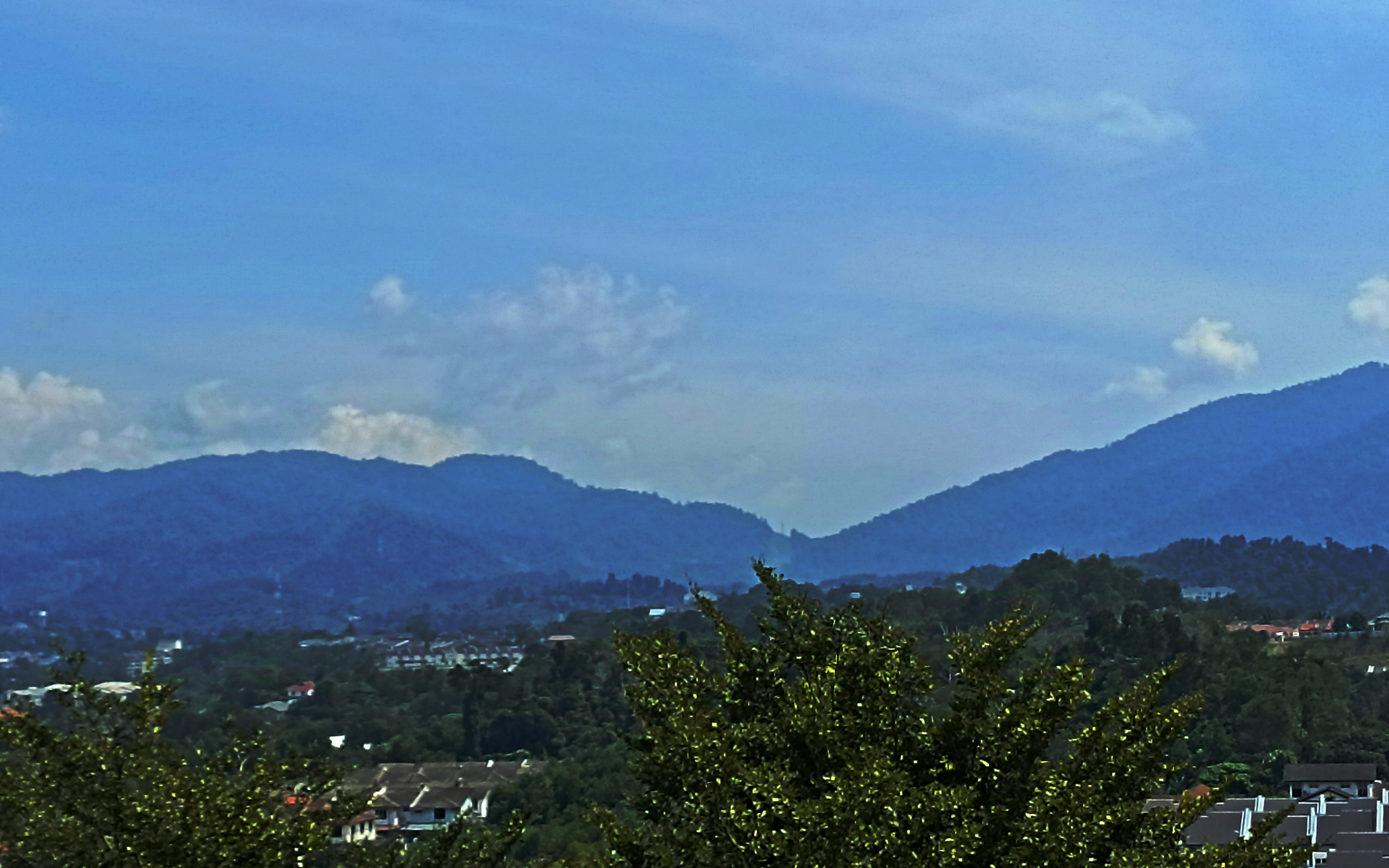
Bukit Putus, recognizable as a V-shaped notch between the Telapak Buruk-Berembun massif (left) and Mount Angsi (right).

Bukit Putus is infamous for being the site of the Battle of Bukit Putus of 1875, which was resulted from a conflict between Seri Menanti and the chiefdoms of Sungai Ujong, Jelebu and Rembau following the installation of Tunku Antah as Yamtuan Besar, which was validated by Seri Menanti's royal domains (Luak Tanah Mengandung) and Johol. This led to the subsequent dissolution of Negeri Sembilan, where Sungai Ujong, Jelebu and Rembau decisively left the confederacy in protest to the installation, as it was deemed has infringed their rights as Undang to elect and nominate a new Yamtuan Besar. The conflict was further exacerbated by the presence of the British in Sungai Ujong, led by Resident Capt. Patrick J. Murray. It was here where George Channer earned his Victoria Cross.
