= Mount Angsi =

Mountain in Negeri Sembilan, Malaysia

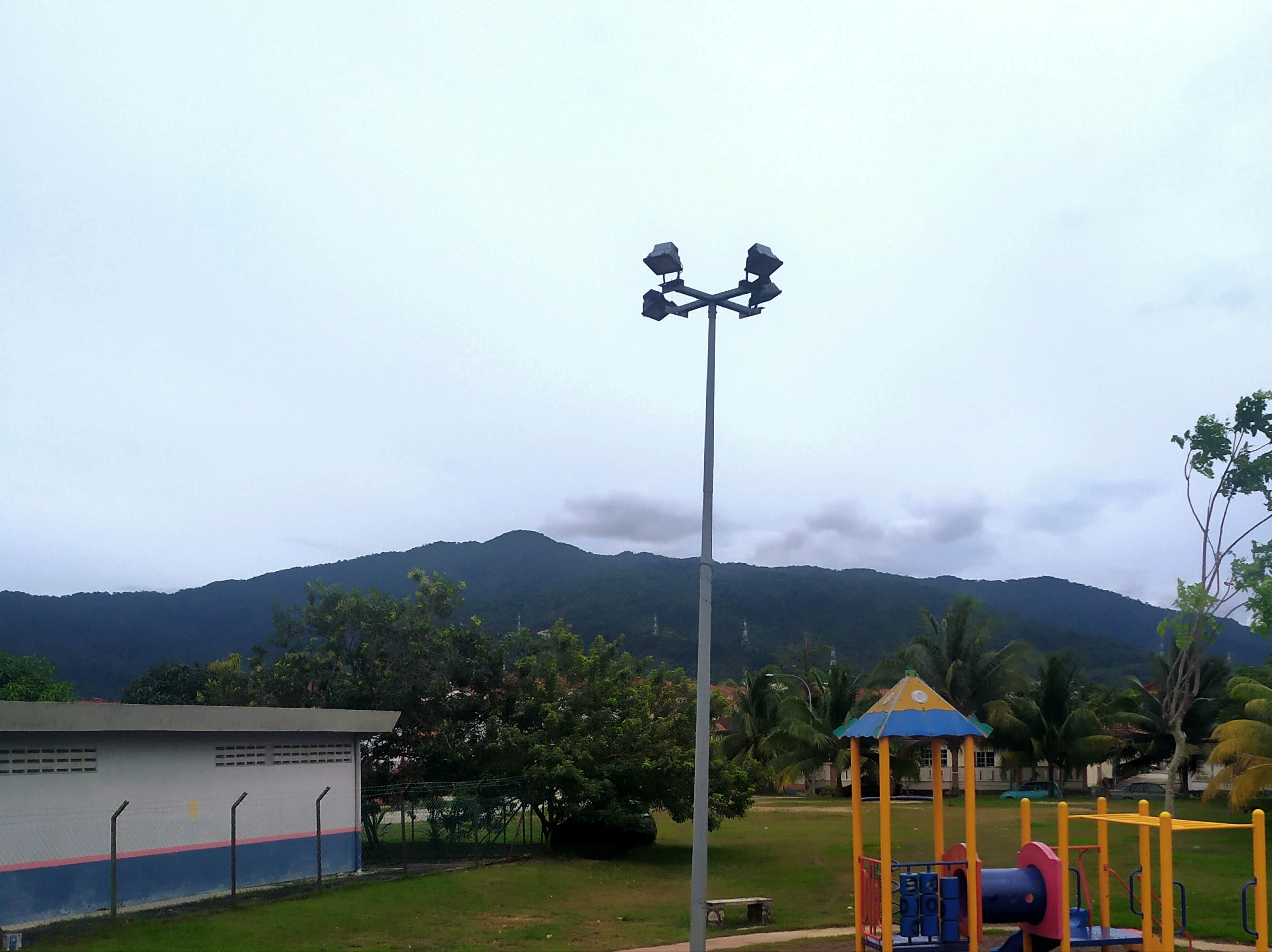
- Mount Angsi, seen from the southwest

Highest point
- Elevation: 825 m (2,707 ft)
- Listing: Mountains of Malaysia
- Coordinates: 2°41′54″N 102°02′53″E

Naming
- Native name: Gunung Angsi (Malay)

Geography
- Location within Malaysia
- Country: Malaysia
- State: Negeri Sembilan
- Districts: Kuala Pilah and Seremban
- Parent range: Titiwangsa Mountains

Climbing
- Easiest route: Hiking via Bukit Putus (north) or Ulu Bendul (east)

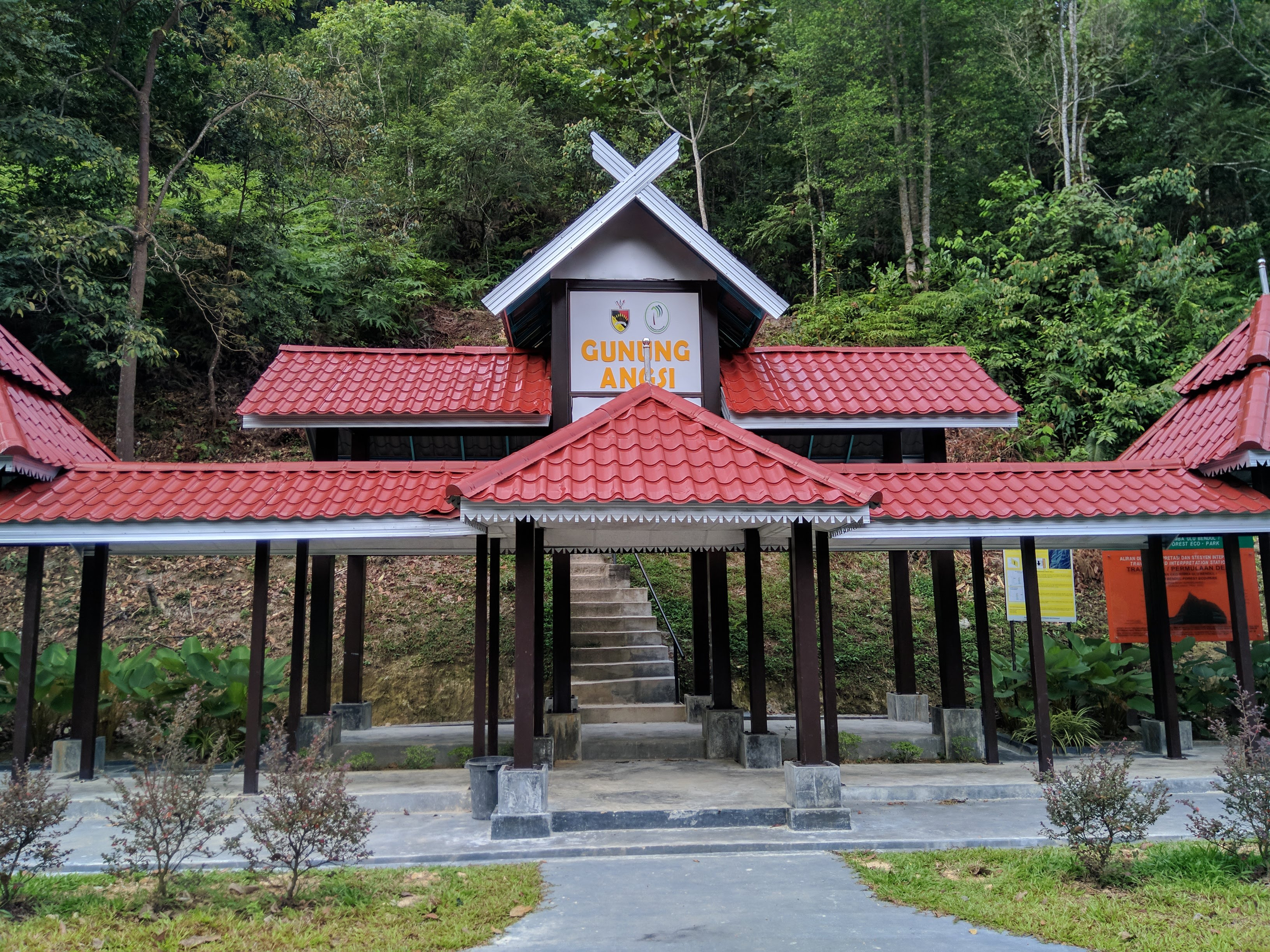
Landmark at Mount Angsi's hiking trailhead near Bukit Putus

Mount Angsi (Malay: Gunung Angsi) is a mountain located between the border of Ulu Bendul, Kuala Pilah District and Senawang, Seremban District in Negeri Sembilan, Malaysia.

Part of the Titiwangsa Mountains, it is the seventh tallest mountain in the state, behind Mts. Besar Hantu, Hantu Kecil, Telapak Buruk, Berembun and Datuk, with an elevation of 2,707 feet (825 m).

== Hill station ==
The mountain was the site of a minor hill station in the early twentieth century and featured a bungalow, situated at an altitude of 762 metres (2,500 ft).

== Gallery ==
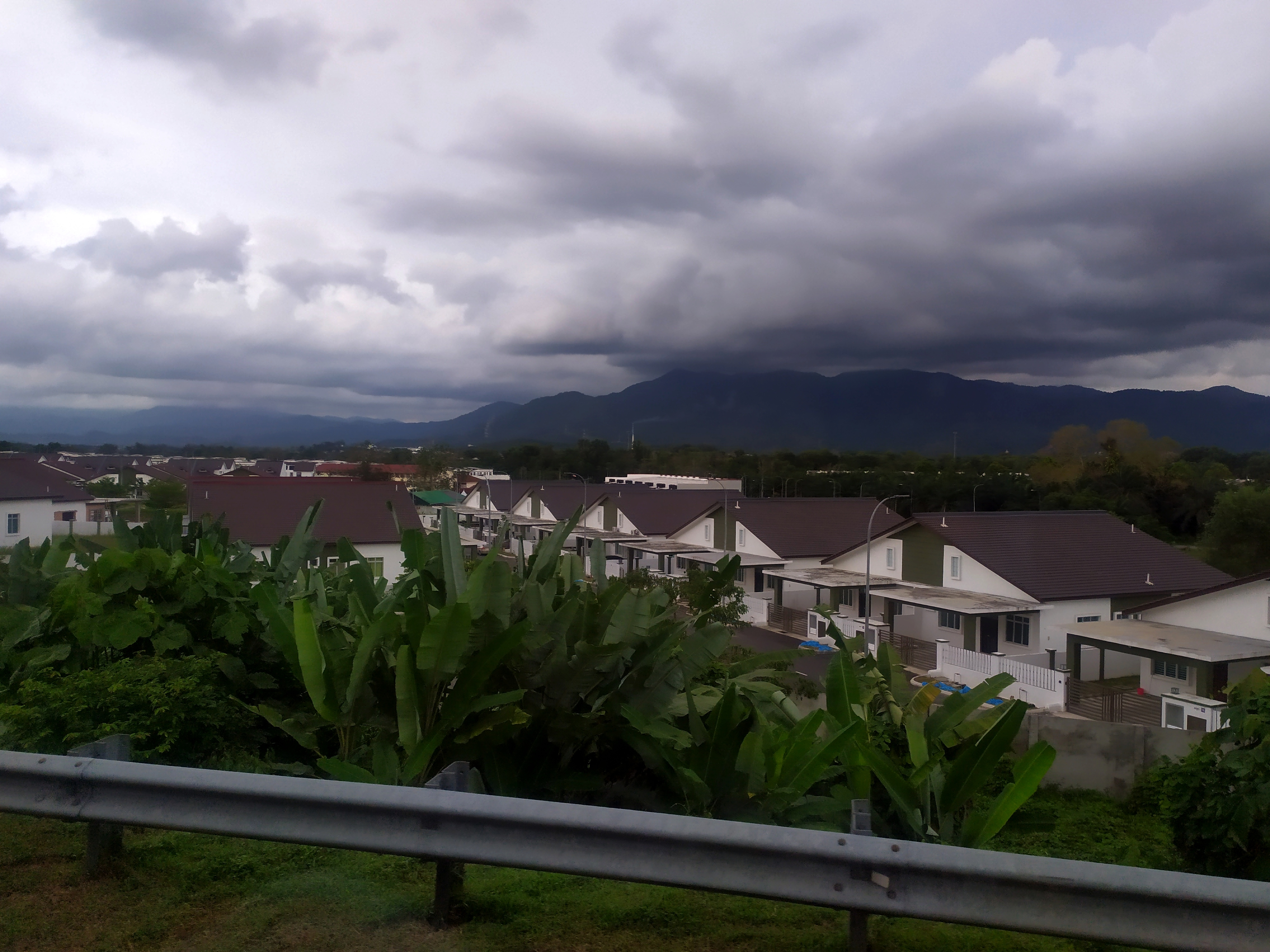
The Negri Titiwangsa as seen from the North–South Expressway Southern Route in Senawang. From left to right: Telapak Buruk-Berembun and Angsi.

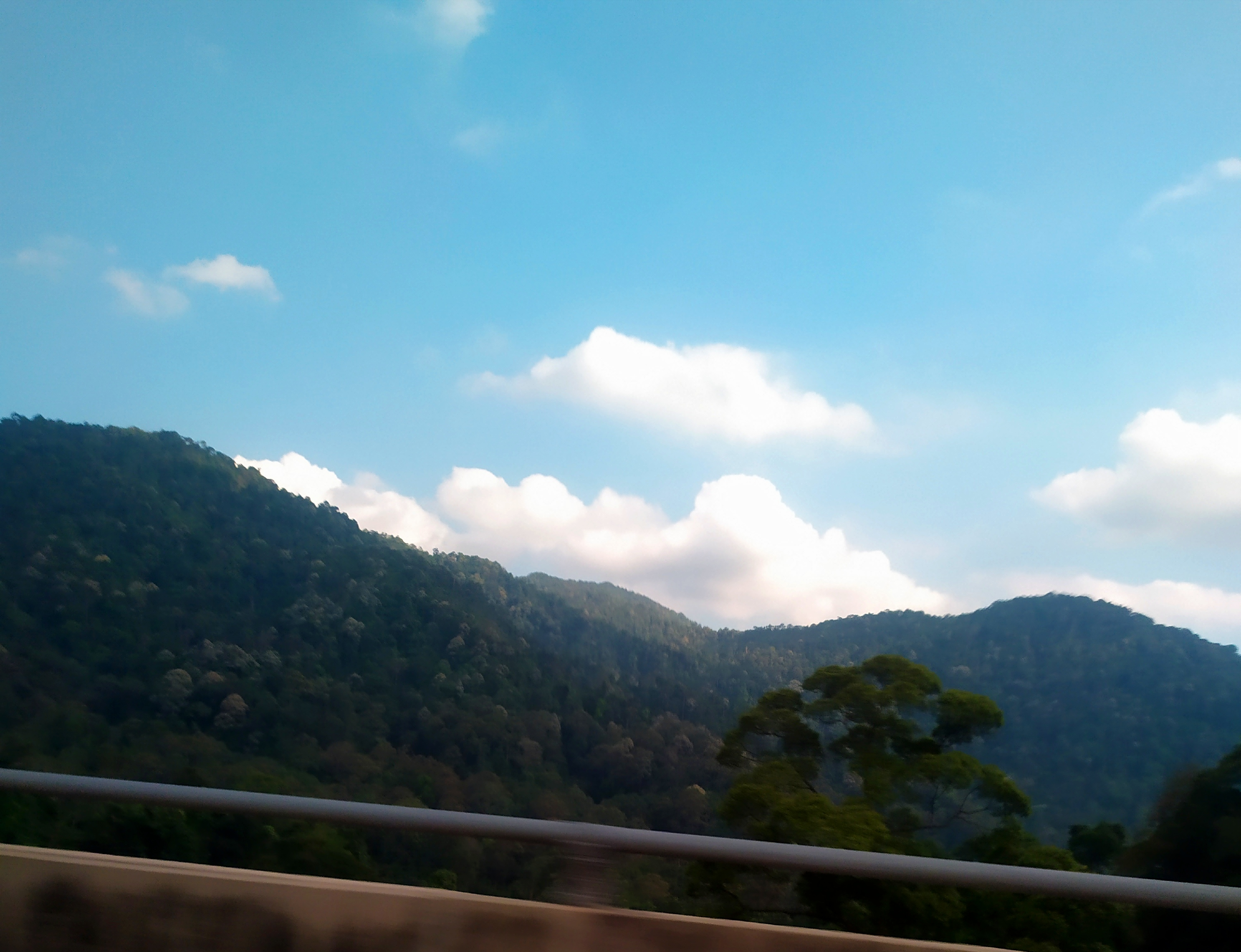
Mount Angsi as viewed from the Bukit Putus Viaduct.

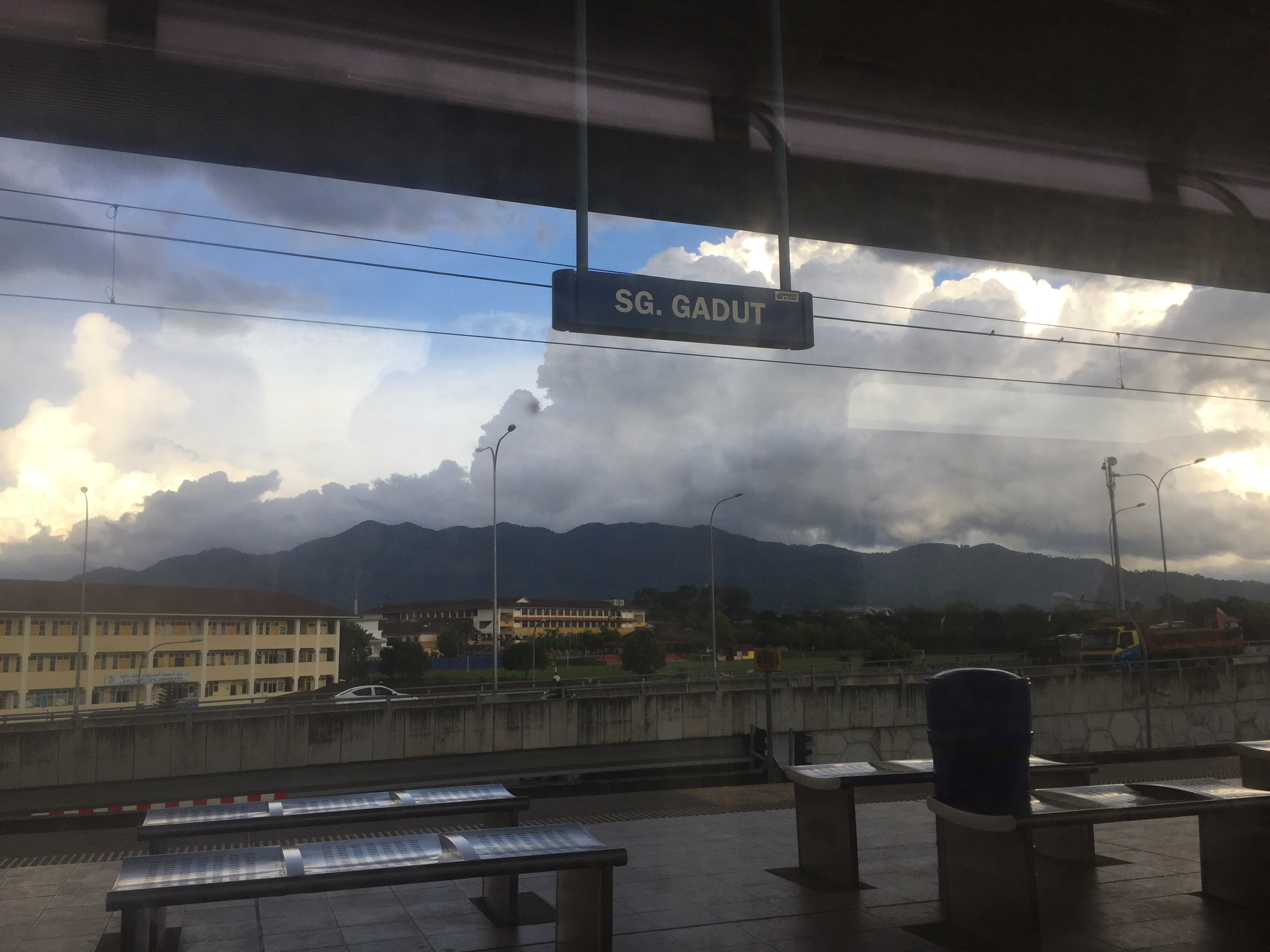
The mountain as seen from the Sungai Gadut Komuter station.

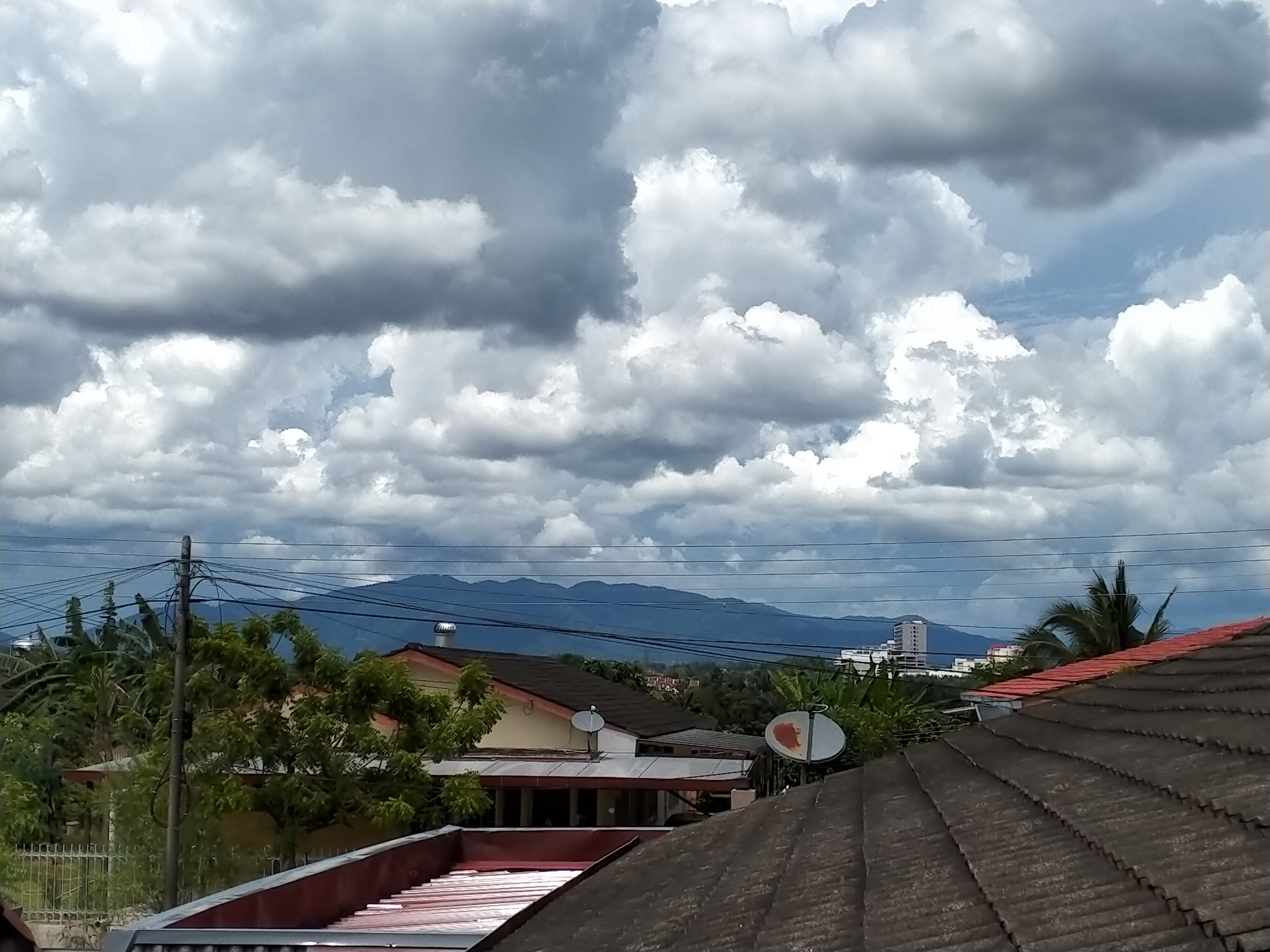
Viewed from Mambau.

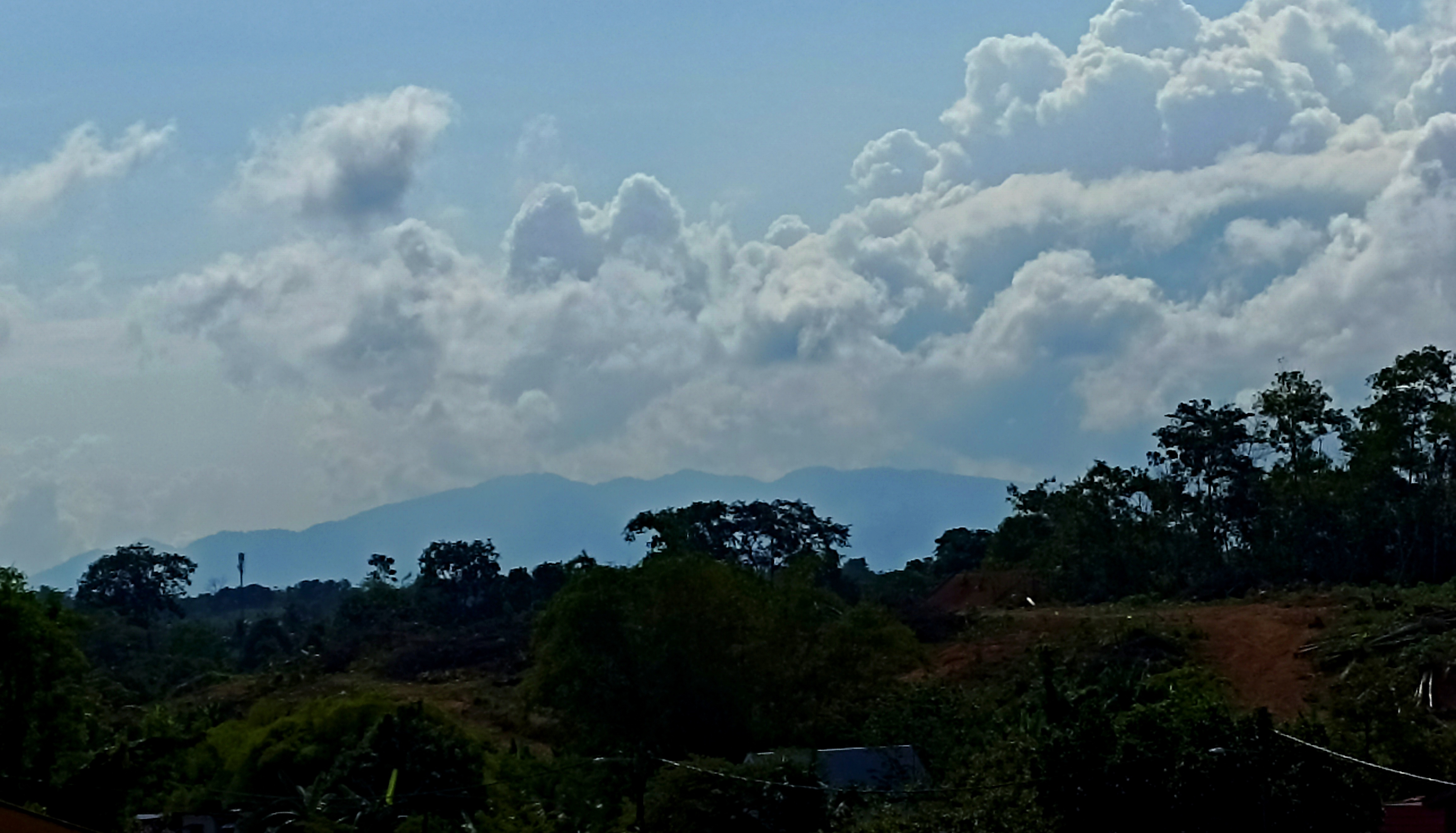
Also from Mambau, from a different vantage point.
