= Ulu Bendul =

Nature park in Malaysia

Ulu Bendul (alternatively spelt Ulu Bendol, Negeri Sembilan Malay: Lubondo; Jawi: اولو‌ بندول) is a nature reserve in Kuala Pilah District, Negeri Sembilan, Malaysia, at the foot of Mount Angsi. There is also a village nearby with the same name. The nature reserve is served by Federal Route FT 51.

== Incidents ==
Bathing pools at the park were temporarily closed in September 2021 after several individuals were believed to have contracted leptospirosis or rotavirus infections there.
