= Tanjung Ipoh =

- Hamlet
- Location of Tanjung Ipoh Tanjung Ipoh (Peninsular Malaysia) Tanjung Ipoh (Malaysia)
- Coordinates: 2°45′N 102°12′E
- Country: Malaysia
- State: Negeri Sembilan
- District: Kuala Pilah
- Luak: Ulu Muar
- Time zone: UTC+8 (MYT)
- Postal code: 71500

Tanjung Ipoh is a small town in Kuala Pilah District, Negeri Sembilan, Malaysia. It is situated along the main road linking Kuala Pilah with the Seremban, the state capital.

Tanjung Ipoh in Kuala Pilah District
