= Tuanku Munawir Royal Mosque =

Mosque in Negeri Sembilan, Malaysia

- Masjid Diraja Tuanku Munawir مسجد دراج توانكو مناور
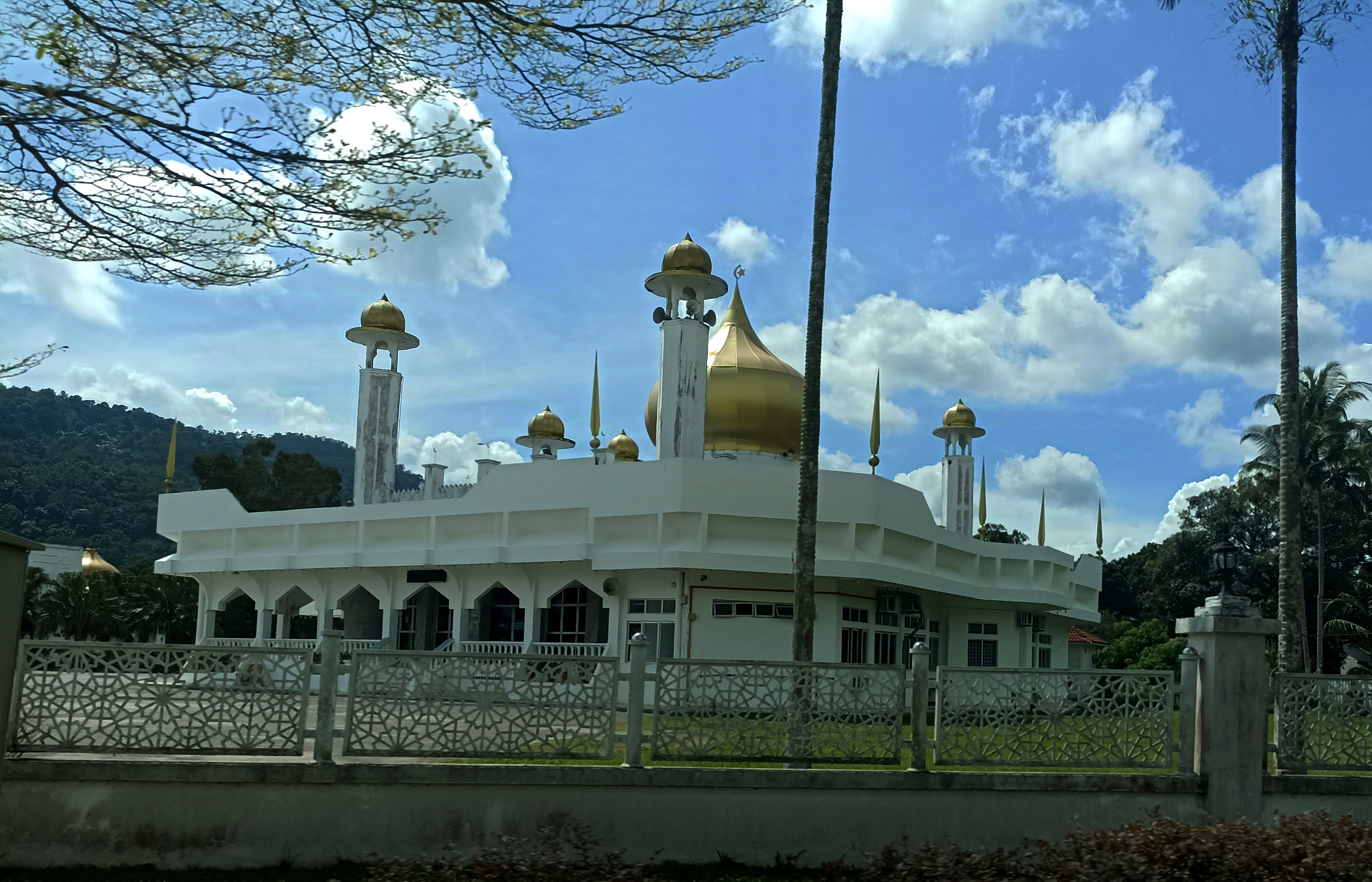

- Location within Negeri Sembilan

Religion
- Affiliation: Islam
- Branch/tradition: Shafi'i Sunni
- Ecclesiastical or organizational status: Mosque
- Status: Active

Location
- Location: Seri Menanti, Kuala Pilah District, Negeri Sembilan, Malaysia
- Interactive map of Tuanku Munawir Royal Mosque
- Coordinates: 2.6977217°N 102.1604893°E

Architecture
- Type: Mosque architecture
- Style: Modernist and Mughal
- Founder: Tuanku Munawir
- Groundbreaking: 1964
- Completed: 1970

Specifications
- Capacity: 1,500
- Dome: 8
- Minaret: 4

The Tuanku Munawir Royal Mosque (Malay: Masjid Diraja Tuanku Munawir) is a mosque in Seri Menanti, the royal capital of the Malaysian state of Negeri Sembilan. It is situated next to the Seri Menanti Royal Mausoleum.

== History ==
The original mosque in Kampung Tanjung Beringin, situated 500 metres north of the current mosque, was built in 1885 on a parcel of land donated by Tuanku Muhammad, the seventh Yang di-Pertuan Besar. Currently, the mosque is out of usage and is gazetted as a national heritage building.

Groundbreaking of the current mosque started in 1964, which was officiated by Tuanku Munawir, the Yang di-Pertuan Besar at the time, and it finished construction and inaugurated in 1970. The site where the mosque is standing is also a mortmain of the Negeri Sembilan royal family.

== Architecture ==
The mosque exhibits strong Mughal influence with a hint of Modernist twist in its architecture. Its design consists of a large main golden dome in the centre surrounded by four minarets erected at each corner of the mosque building, and a smaller dome crowning the mosque's portico. The mosque can accommodate up to 1,500 worshippers at once.
