= Bukit Putus Viaduct =

Bukit Putus Viaduct Jambatan Bukit Putus
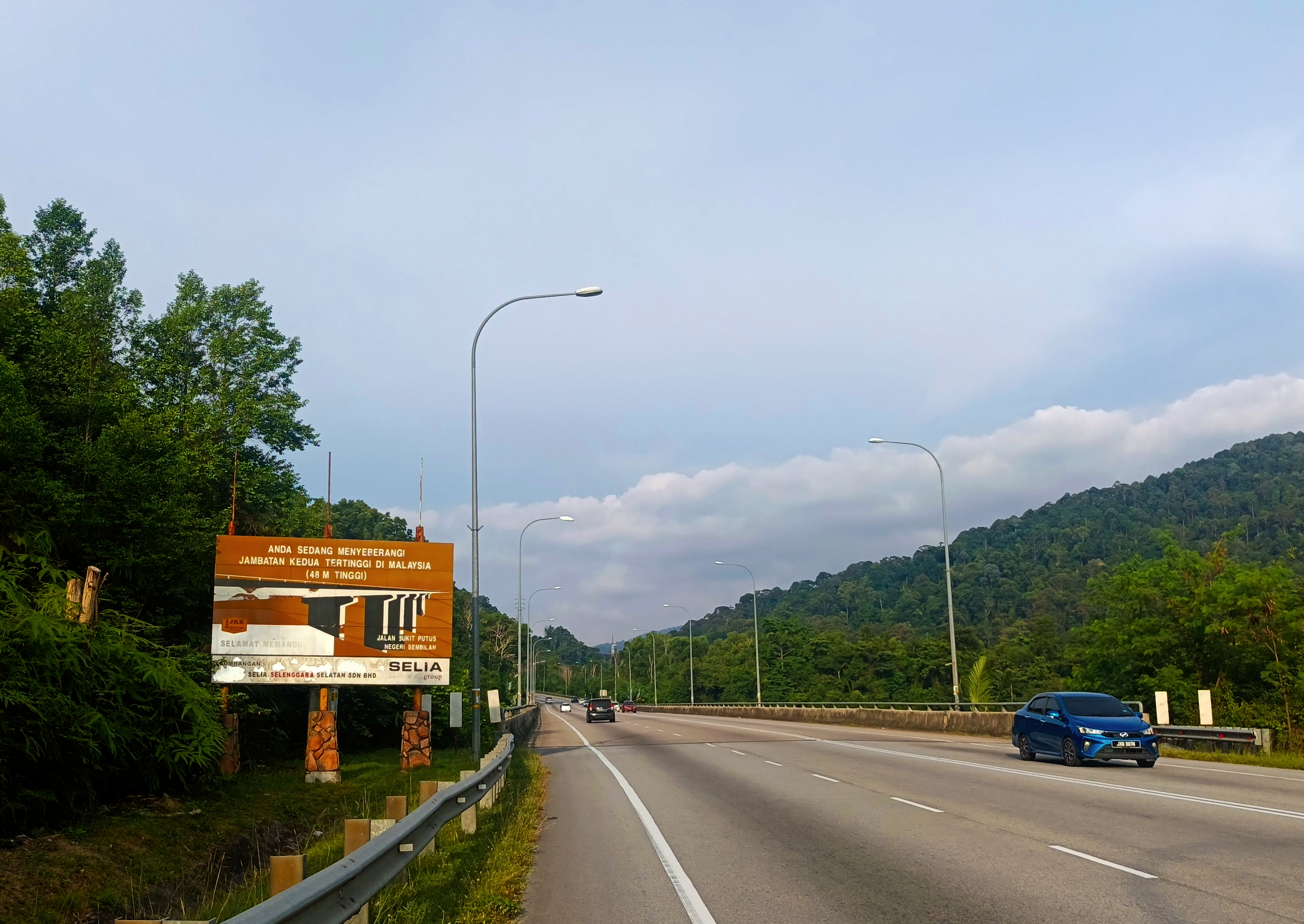
- Coordinates: 2°43′47″N 102°02′42″E
- Carries: Motor vehicles
- Crosses: Berembun Forest Reserve, Titiwangsa Mountains
- Locale: FT 51 Jalan Seremban-Kuala Pilah
- Maintained by: Malaysian Public Works Department; Selia Selenggara Selatan Sdn Bhd

Characteristics
- Design: box girder bridge
- Total length: 300 m
- Width: --
- Height: 48 m
- Longest span: --

History
- Designer: Malaysian Public Works Department
- Constructed by: Malaysian Public Works Department
- Opened: 2009

Location
- Interactive map of Bukit Putus Viaduct

The Bukit Putus Viaduct (Malay: Jambatan Bukit Putus) is a motorway viaduct that carries Federal Route FT 51 near Bukit Putus, Negeri Sembilan, Malaysia. At 48 metres tall, it is the fourth highest bridge in Malaysia, after Jalan Bukit Kukus Paired Road, Rawang Bypass and Lojing Viaduct.

The viaduct was opened in November 2009, replacing the dangerous older section that winds up the Titiwangsa Mountains (redesignated as FT 361).
