= Apam johol =

Sweetened rice cake in Malaysia

Apam Johol
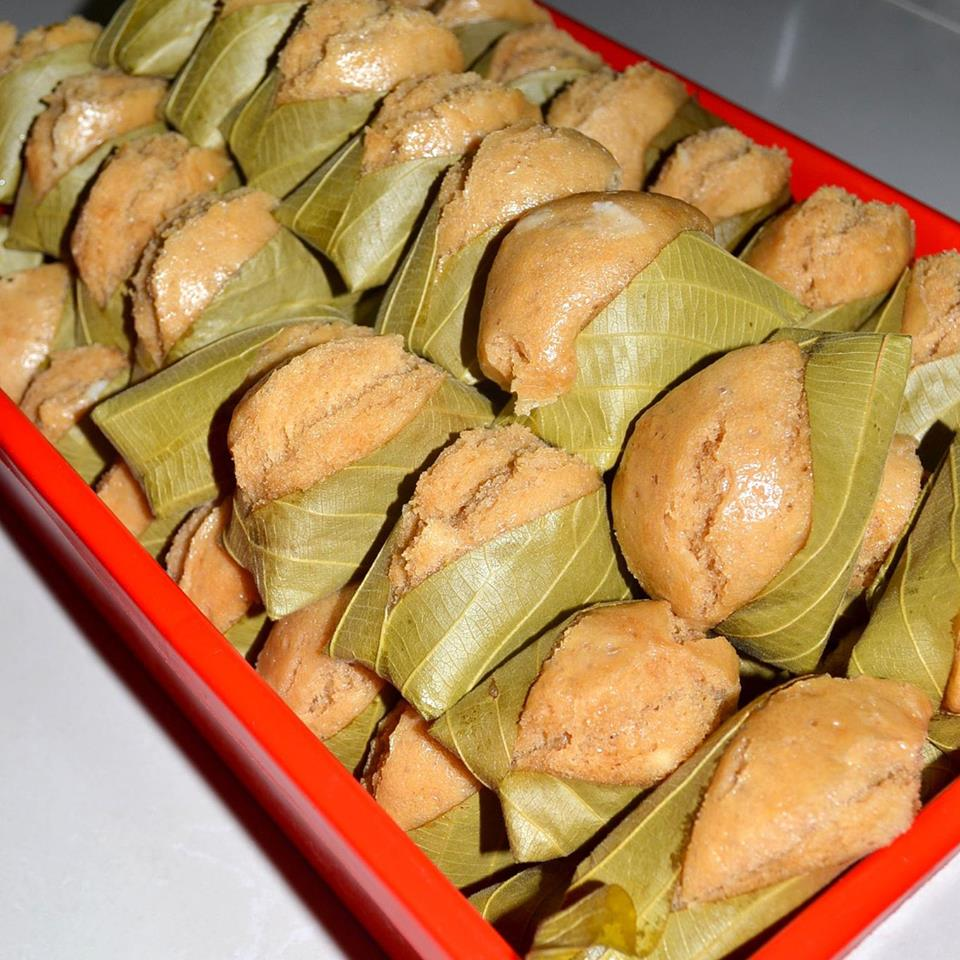
- Type: Snack
- Place of origin: Malaysia
- Region or state: Negeri Sembilan
- Created by: Malay
- Main ingredients: rice flour, eggs, sugar, yeast, rambai leaves

Apam johol or apam daun rambai is a traditional food, a sweetened rice cake, in Negeri Sembilan, Malaysia. The food is wrapped in rambai leaves to preserve the aroma and to make it look good. It is sometimes eaten with rendang, sambal tumis and bean porridge. It is usually served during breakfast or teatime.

== See also ==
- Cuisine of Malaysia
