= Negeri Sembilan =

State of Malaysia

Negeri Sembilan Nogoghi Sombilan
- State
- State of Negeri Sembilan Negeri Sembilan (Malay)
- Flag Coat of arms
- Nicknames: Negeri Beradat (Customary State); Darul Khusus (Special Abode)
- Anthem: Berkatlah Yang DiPertuan Besar Negeri Sembilan (Bless the Great Ruler of Negeri Sembilan)
- Negeri Sembilan in Malaysia
- Interactive map of Negeri Sembilan
- Coordinates: 2°41′53″N 102°09′24″E
- Country: Malaysia
- Capital (and largest city): Seremban
- Royal capital: Seri Menanti

Government
  - Type: Federated parliamentary constitutional elective monarchy
  - Yang di-Pertuan Besar: Muhriz (Disputed) (Note: The Undang Yang Empat did not recognize Tuanku Muhriz as the legitimate Yang di-Pertuan Besar of Negeri Sembilan since the 2026 Negeri Sembilan constitutional crisis and subsequent collective recognition by Negeri Sembilan EXCO committee under Ismail Lasim, and installed Tunku Nadzaruddin Tuanku Ja'afar as the new Yang di-Pertuan Besar. However, the installation was not recognized by the Federal Government, Negeri Sembilan state government under Aminuddin Harun or the Tunku Besar Seri Menanti. Tuanku Muhriz continues to have de jure rule over Negeri Sembilan.)
  - Ruling Chiefs (Undang Yang Empat and Tunku Besar of Tampin): 1. Muhammad Faris Johari, Undang of Sungai Ujong (disputed) (Note: Only recognized by the Dewan Keadilan dan Undang and Tuanku Muhriz. Several leaders still recognize Datuk Mubarak Dohak as the Undang of Sungai Ujong.); 2. Azrin Khairi, Undang of Jelebu (disputed) (Note: Only recognized by the "Dewan Keadilan dan Undang" and Tuanku Muhriz. Several leaders still recognize Datuk Maarof Mat Rashad as the Undang of Jelebu.); 3. Muhammed Abdullah, Undang of Johol; 4. Hassan Ab Hamid, Undang of Rembau (disputed) (Note: Only recognized by the "Dewan Keadilan dan Undang" and Tuanku Muhriz. Several leaders still recognize Datuk Abdul Rahim Yasin as the Undang of Rembau.); 5. Razman al-Qadri, Tunku Besar of Tampin
  - Menteri Besar: Ismail Lasim (BN–UMNO)

Area
  - Total: 6,686 km^{2} (2,581 sq mi)
- Highest elevation (Mount Besar Hantu): 1,462 m (4,796 ft)

Population (2020)
  - Total: 1,199,974
  - Density: 179.5/km^{2} (464.8/sq mi)
- Demonym(s): Negri (i.e. "Negriwoman", "Negri folk" etc.)

Human Development Index
  - HDI (2024): 0.825 (very high) (7th)
- Postal code: 70xxx to 73xxx
- Calling code: 06
- Vehicle registration: N
- Federated into FMS: 1895
- Japanese occupation: 1942
- Accession into the Federation of Malaya: 1948
- Independence as part of the Federation of Malaya: 31 August 1957
- Website: www.ns.gov.my

Negeri Sembilan (Malay pronunciation: [nəgəˈri səmbiˈlan], Negeri Sembilan Malay: Nogoghi Sombilan, Nismilan), historically spelled as Negri Sembilan and also known by the shorthand N9, is a state in Malaysia which lies on the western coast of Peninsular Malaysia. It borders Selangor on the north, Pahang in the east, and Malacca and Johor to the south. The Arabic honorific title of the state is Darul Khusus (دار الخصوص; "The Special Abode").

The capital of Negeri Sembilan is Seremban. The royal capital is Seri Menanti in Kuala Pilah District. Other important towns are Port Dickson, Bahau and Nilai. The name is believed to derive from the nine (sembilan) villages or nagari in the Minangkabau language (now known as luak) settled by the Minangkabau (or Menangkabau), a people originally from West Sumatra (in present-day Indonesia). Minangkabau features are still visible today in traditional architecture and the dialect of Malay spoken.

Unlike the hereditary monarchs of the other royal Malay states, the ruler of Negeri Sembilan is elected and is known as Yang di-Pertuan Besar instead of Sultan. He is elected by the council of Undangs who lead the four largest territories of Sungai Ujong, Jelebu, Johol, and Rembau, from the legitimate male members of the Pagaruyung dynasty, with the surviving sons of the previous Yamtuan coming first in the considerations but not being obligatory to be voted on, making it one of the more democratic monarchies. Negeri Sembilan is also the only state in Malaysia that is a coregency, where the Yang di-Pertuan Besar, the four Undangs and the Tunku Besar of Tampin together share the power as rulers of the state.

The economy of Negeri Sembilan is mainly based on agriculture, manufacturing and services. Seremban and Port Dickson districts are the state's major economic hubs, both constituting the Malaysia Vision Valley corridor.

Negeri Sembilan has diverse tropical rainforests and an equatorial climate. The state's mountain ranges belong to the Titiwangsa Mountains, a southern subrange of the Tenasserim Hills that span throughout southern Myanmar, southern Thailand and Peninsular Malaysia, with Mount Besar Hantu as the highest point. The Titiwangsa also ends here, at Mount Tampin, located south of the state.

== Etymology ==
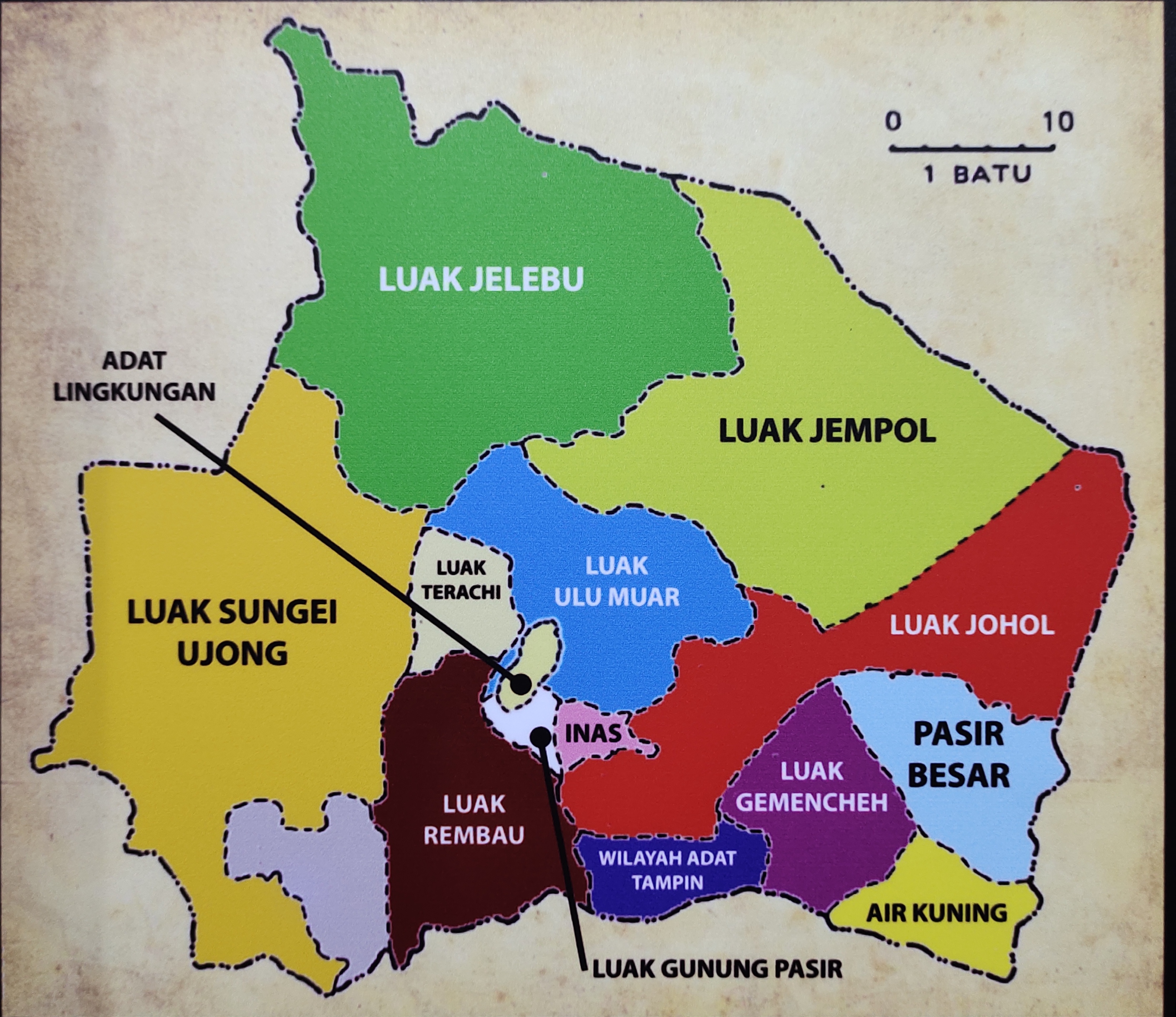
Luaks of modern Negeri Sembilan. The unlabeled luak south of Sungai Ujong is Linggi. State Museum, Seremban.

The name of Negeri Sembilan literally translates to "State (of the) Nine". It is believed to have been derived from the nine chiefdoms settled by the Minangkabau, known as Nogoghi in the Negeri Sembilan dialect, also known as luak (Minangkabau: luak, luhak). The size of modern Negeri Sembilan is smaller than its historical extent.

The confederation of original nine chiefdoms (luak) of Negeri Sembilan, at Raja Melewar's accession in 1773

== History ==
=== Early history ===
The earliest possible human settlement in Negeri Sembilan can be traced back around 14,000 years to the Pasoh Caves, a complex of karst caves near Simpang Pertang in the Jelebu district. Artefacts found around the caves include stone tools and food remains, estimated to date from 12,000 BCE based on carbon dating. The early inhabitants of Negeri Sembilan were the ancestors of the Semelai, Semai, Semang, and Jakun peoples, who lived either as hunter-gatherer nomads or as subsistence farmers.

According to the Malay Annals, Parameswara reportedly visited the settlement of Sening Ujong, which was located in what is now Seremban.

The Minangkabaus from Sumatra settled in what is today Negeri Sembilan in the 15th century, under the protection of the Malacca Sultanate and later the Sultanate of Johor. They also brought their matrilineal custom, known as Adat Perpatih, which became the local custom.

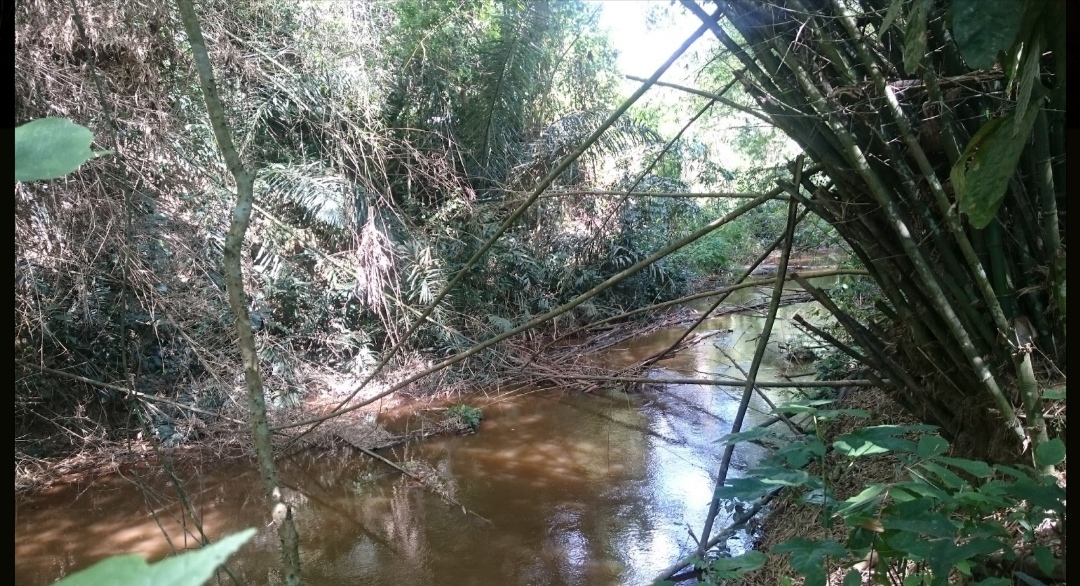
Headwaters of the Muar River near Kuala Pilah. The Muar, along with the Linggi, was one of the most important trade routes in medieval Negeri Sembilan.

The Linggi River along the western part of the state, and the Muar River were used as major trade routes since the time of the Malacca Sultanate. The former linked the tin-rich area of Sungai Ujong to the port city of Malacca; while the latter, along with the Pahang River via the Serting River in walking distance to the east, formed part of the Laluan Penarikan (lit. 'portage route' in Malay), facilitating access between the Strait of Malacca and the South China Sea.

As Johor weakened in the 18th century, attacks by the Bugis forced the Minangkabaus to seek protection from their homeland. The Minangkabau ruler, Sultan Abdul Jalil, obliged by sending his near relative, Raja Mahmud, also known as Raja Melewar.

When Raja Melewar arrived, he found that another royal, Raja Khatib had already established himself as ruler. He declared war against Raja Khatib and became the ruler of Negeri Sembilan. The Sultan of Johor confirmed his position by granting the title Yamtuan Seri Menanti ("He Who is Highest Lord of the Seri Menanti") in 1773.

=== Nine chiefdoms ===
At the time of its establishment, Negeri Sembilan was originally a loose confederation of nine chiefdoms (luaks), hence the name. During Raja Melewar's rule, it covered a larger area than its modern-day boundaries. In addition to the entire modern-day Negeri Sembilan, it also encompassed parts of what are now Selangor, Malacca, Pahang and Johor.

The original nine chiefdoms or domains that made up the first incarnation of Negeri Sembilan in 1773, and gave the state its name, were:

1. Sungai Ujong
2. Jelebu
3. Rembau
4. Johol
5. Jelai
6. Ulu Pahang
7. Naning
8. Segamat
9. Klang

Historically, all luak concentrically revolved around Seri Menanti as a center flanked by four inner luak serambi and four outer luak akin to a mandala. Ulu Pahang, Naning, Segamat and Klang were annexed into neighbouring states in the 19th century; Naning was incorporated into the Straits Settlement of Malacca in 1832 following the Naning War.

Ulu Pahang became the Bera region of Pahang, Segamat was annexed by Johor, and Klang became part of the Kuala Langat region of Selangor.

After Raja Melewar's death in 1795, a series of disputes arose over the succession. For a considerable period, the local nobles appealed to the Minangkabau ruler in Sumatra for a new ruler. However, competing interests supported different candidates, often resulting in further instability and civil war.

=== Colonial era ===
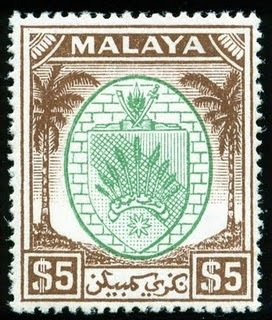
A 1949 5-dollar stamp of the Federation of Malaya, bearing the state's arms

In 1874, the British intervened militarily in a leadership tussle in Sungai Ujong to preserve British economic interests and placed the domain under the control of a British Resident. Jelebu followed in 1883 and Rembau in 1887. Their presence was detested by the locals, which eventually paved the way to a deadly civil war and subsequent breakup.

==== Battle of Paroi ====
In 1875, British forces, accompanied by Arab mercenaries and Gurkha, engaged Malay defenders in Paroi at the Battle of Paroi. Despite initial setbacks, the British ultimately prevailed, capturing the Malay stronghold. Casualties were heavy on both sides, with the British and Arab contingents suffering 37 killed and wounded, while the Malay had around 35 deaths and many wounded.

==== Battle of Bukit Putus ====
After the Battle of Paroi, the British waited for Gurkha reinforcements, which arrived on 10 December 1875. The Malays fortified Bukit Putus, a mountain pass on the boundary between Sungai Ujong and Terachi. The British attacked Bukit Putus from both the front and back. The Gurkhas successfully captured the Malay stockade at Bukit Putus. The Malays retreated after the surprise appearance of Sungai Ujong Resident P.J. Murray's forces from behind. The inhabitants of the Terachi Valley fled, villages were burned, and Yamtuan Antah's palace in Seri Menanti was destroyed.

==== Seri Menanti Confederation, modern Negeri Sembilan and statehood ====
The formation of modern Negeri Sembilan began in 1889, when the Seri Menanti domain, under the rule of Tuanku Muhammad (son of Yamtuan Antah), combined with the domains of Tampin and Rembau, forming the Seri Menanti Confederation as a single political entity.

The domains of Sungai Ujong and Jelebu joined this confederation in 1895, forming the state of Negeri Sembilan in its modern borders. Martin Lister became the new state's first Resident, and Negeri Sembilan became part of the Federated Malay States the same year.

=== Modern history ===
In the first half of the 20th century, rural Negeri Sembilan saw large deforestation due to demand for natural rubber (Hevea brasiliensis); 6,188 plantations were counted in 1903 and were 396,065 counted in 1939. It was occupied by the Japanese in World War II between 1942 and 1945, joined the Federation of Malaya in 1948 and became a state of Malaysia in 1963.

In the 1970s and 1980s, towns like Rembau grew rapidly from the migration of villagers who no longer farmed rice; rice farming disappeared from most villages across the state by the 1990s. In the 1990s and 2000s, Seremban and Nilai attracted people who migrated from the overcrowded towns of the Klang Valley area. These two cities also became home to new factories and industrial parks, contributing to the state's modern development.

On 9 September 2009, the Ministry of Housing and Local Government approved the state capital of Seremban's application to become a city (Bandar Raya), as it had experienced significant population growth. To make this possible, its city council had to be merged with the Nilai Municipal Council. After several postponements, Seremban officially attained city status on 20 January 2020.

Negeri Sembilan was placed under the Movement Control Order lockdown due to increasing COVID-19 infections.

== Geography ==
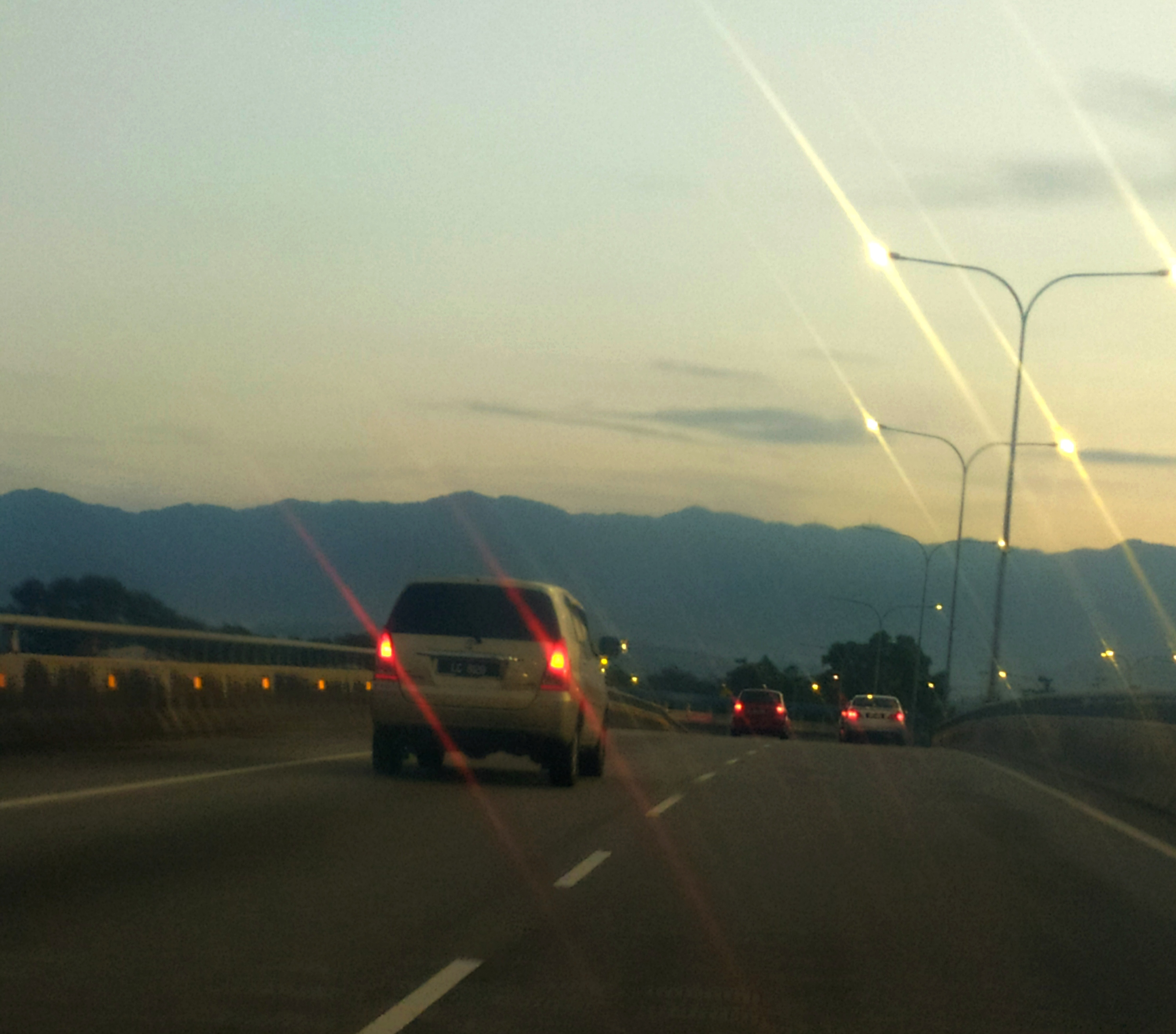
The Titiwangsa Mountains towers over Seremban

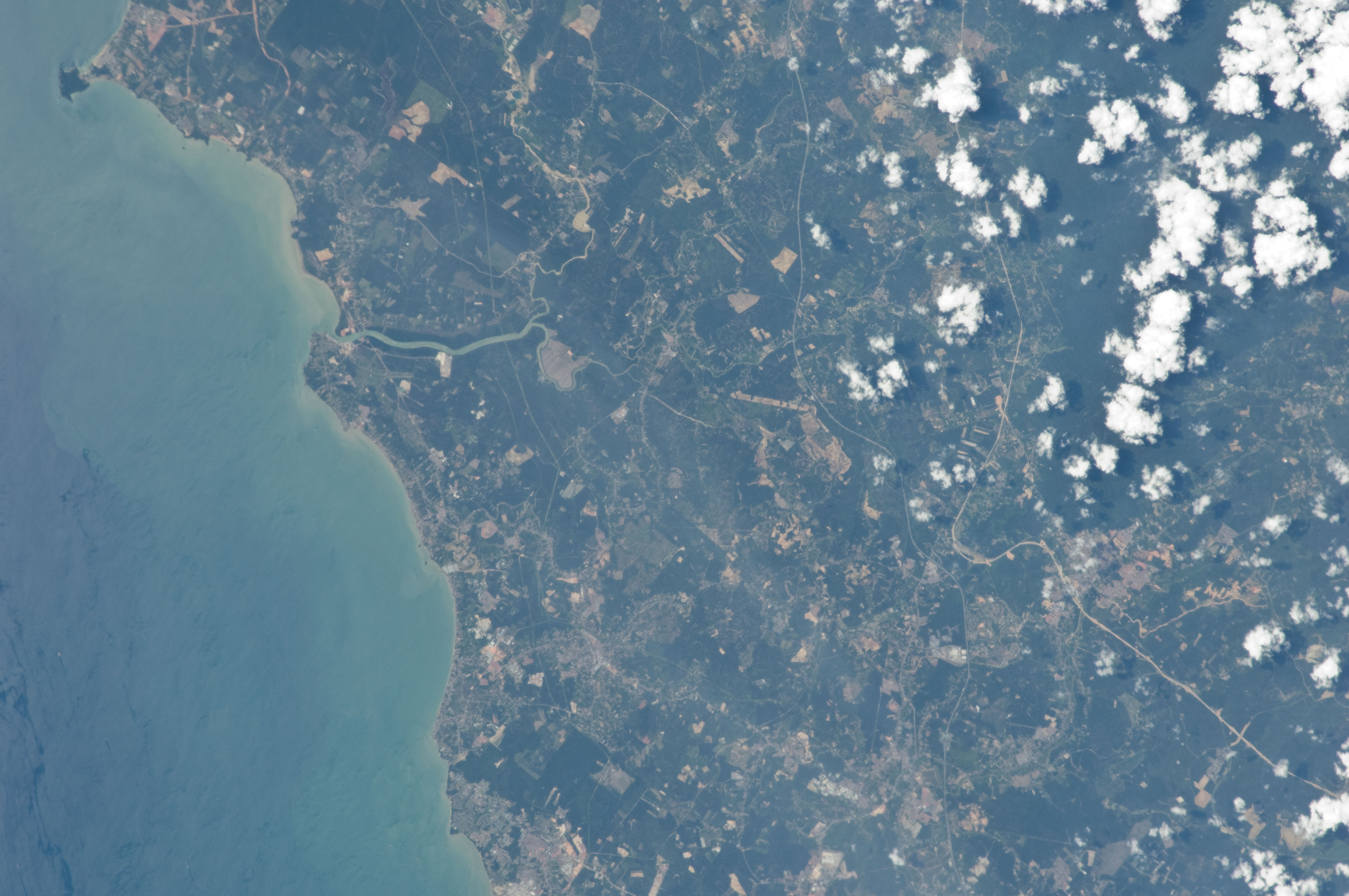
The western end of the Linggi River basin, as seen from space. Also seen here is the town of Tampin (to the right side of the picture), at the southern tip of the Titiwangsa Mountains.

Facing the Strait of Malacca, Negeri Sembilan is one of the West Coast states of Peninsular Malaysia. It is specifically part of the southern region, along with Malacca and Johor. However, some sources define Negeri Sembilan as a central region state with Selangor and the federal territories of Kuala Lumpur and Putrajaya.

The state is slightly smaller than Selangor, with a total land area of 6,686 km² (430 sq mi). It is the fourth smallest state in Malaysia by area and the second largest in the southern region behind Johor. Its shape is roughly pentagonal.

=== Topography ===
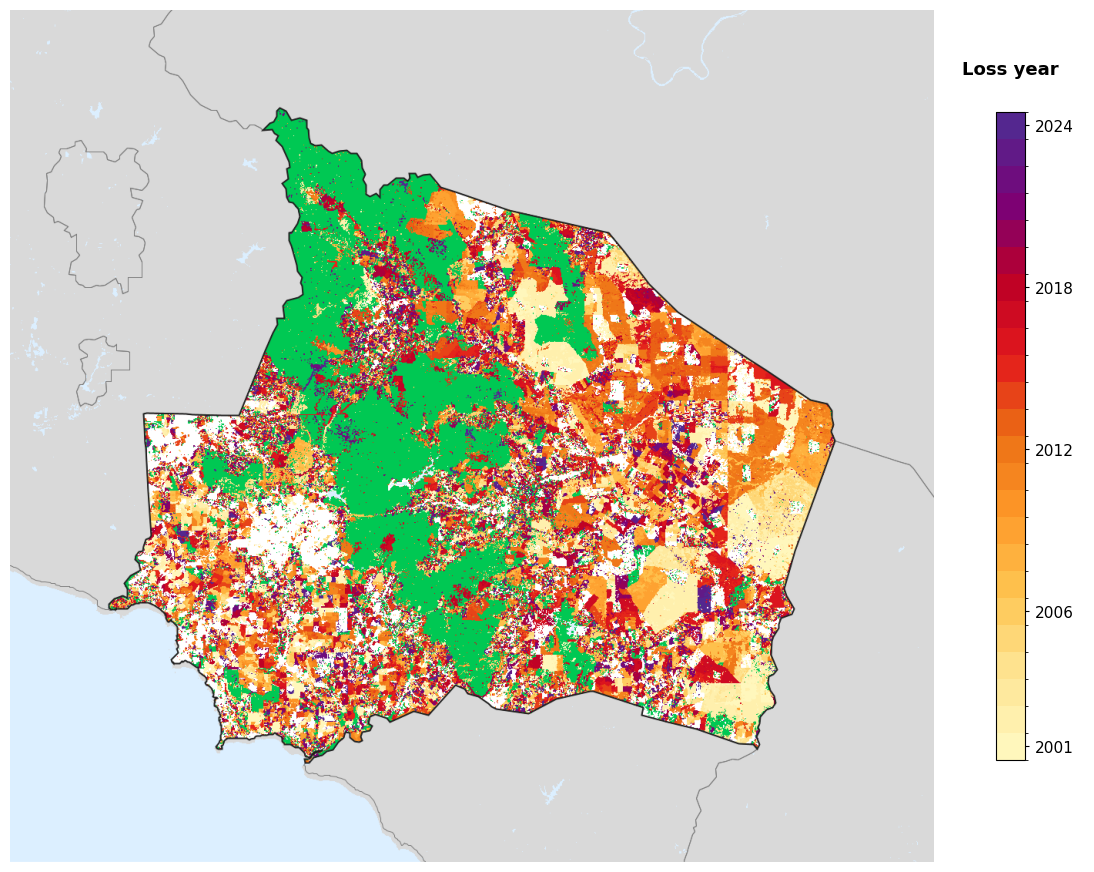
Tree-cover loss year in Negeri Sembilan, 2001-2024, from the Global Forest Change dataset

Topographically, Negeri Sembilan consists of two plains divided by a mountainous spine in the middle. This region is well drained by various rivers on both sides. The Titiwangsa Mountains, the southernmost extension of the Tenasserim Hills and the wider Indo-Malayan Cordillera, spans approximately 92 km (57.1 mi) through the middle of the state. The mountain range starts from the border tripoint with Pahang and Selangor near Kenaboi, Jelebu, and extends towards Tampin, close to the border with Malacca.

This geographical feature results in the state being bisected almost diagonally into two regions; western Negeri Sembilan, consisting of the Port Dickson, Seremban, and Rembau Districts; and eastern Negeri Sembilan, which includes the districts of Jelebu, Kuala Pilah, Jempol, and Tampin. The western half is more developed and has an intricate and concentrated road network compared to the latter, which is predominantly rural.

The Negeri Sembilan section of the Titiwangsa Mountains forms a division for four river basins. The Langat and Linggi Rivers flows through the western half, while the Muar and Pahang Rivers constitute the eastern side. The Linggi and Muar rivers are the two major rivers flowing through the state and serve as significant water sources for the population. Its rainforests form part of the Titiwangsa Forest Complex, a component of the Central Forest Spine conservation area that covers much of the heavily forested and mountainous interior of Peninsular Malaysia.

==== Highest point ====
Mount Besar Hantu, at 1,462 m (4,797 ft), located in Jelebu District and close to the border with Pahang, is the highest point in Negeri Sembilan. The nearby Mount Nuang, which is 31 metres taller, marks the tripoint with Selangor and Pahang at its northernmost point, of which it is the third tallest in the former; while in the south, Mount Ledang, an isolated mountain, marks the tripoint with Malacca and Johor, where it is the highest point of the latter at 1,276 m (4,186.3 ft).

=== Climate ===
Negeri Sembilan experiences equatorial climate (Köppen climate classification: Af), which is hot and humid all year round. Thunderstorms are mostly prevalent during the period of monsoonal transitions that occur twice a year.

Dry seasons usually starts shortly after the first monsoonal transition and lasts until August to September, as the moisture brought by the southwesterly Indo-Australian Monsoon are blocked by the Barisan Mountains in Sumatera, creating a rainshadow effect on the eastern coast of the island and the Malay Peninsula.

In the corresponding Borneo-Australian Monsoon that blows from the northeast, Negeri Sembilan, along with the states of Melaka, Johor, and the East Coast states of Kelantan, Terengganu and Pahang are the most affected by the monsoonal surge that brings persistently heavy rainfall and cause rough sea conditions in the South China Sea.

Climate data for Seremban
Month	Jan	Feb	Mar	Apr	May	Jun	Jul	Aug	Sep	Oct	Nov	Dec	Year
Mean daily maximum °C (°F)	30.9 (87.6)	31.7 (89.1)	32.5 (90.5)	32.2 (90.0)	31.7 (89.1)	31.3 (88.3)	31.1 (88.0)	30.9 (87.6)	31.2 (88.2)	31.2 (88.2)	31.0 (87.8)	31.0 (87.8)	31.4 (88.5)
Daily mean °C (°F)	26.6 (79.9)	27.2 (81.0)	27.7 (81.9)	27.8 (82.0)	27.5 (81.5)	27.1 (80.8)	26.9 (80.4)	26.8 (80.2)	26.9 (80.4)	27.0 (80.6)	26.9 (80.4)	26.8 (80.2)	27.1 (80.8)
Mean daily minimum °C (°F)	22.3 (72.1)	22.7 (72.9)	22.9 (73.2)	23.4 (74.1)	23.4 (74.1)	23.0 (73.4)	22.7 (72.9)	22.8 (73.0)	22.7 (72.9)	22.8 (73.0)	22.9 (73.2)	22.6 (72.7)	22.9 (73.1)
Average precipitation mm (inches)	114 (4.5)	110 (4.3)	178 (7.0)	232 (9.1)	180 (7.1)	119 (4.7)	127 (5.0)	143 (5.6)	158 (6.2)	237 (9.3)	252 (9.9)	193 (7.6)	2,043 (80.3)
Source: Climate-Data.org

== Governance and politics ==
=== Constitution ===
The Constitution of Negeri Sembilan came into force on 26 March 1959. It is divided into two sections. The constitution establishes that the state's form of government is constitutional monarchy and the world's only elective monarchy for a matrilineal society. The system was partially the basis for the federal monarchy.

=== The Ruler ===
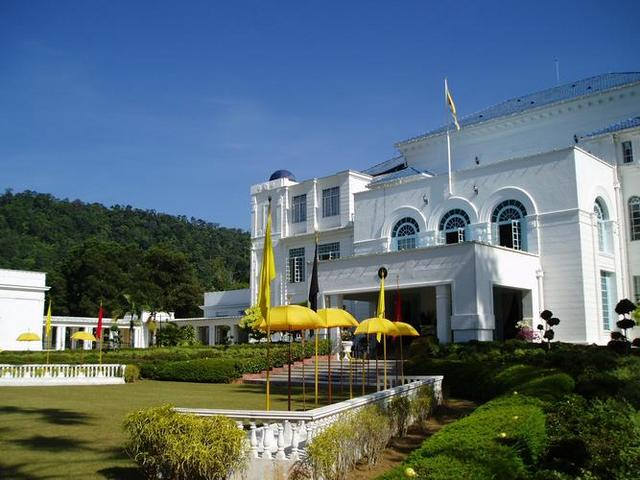
Istana Besar in Seri Menanti, the official residence of the Yamtuan Besar

The official constitutional title of the Ruler of the state is Duli Yang Maha Mulia Yang di-Pertuan Besar Negeri Sembilan, (currently Duli Yang Maha Mulia Yang di-Pertuan Besar Negeri Sembilan Darul Khusus Tuanku Muhriz ibni Almarhum Tuanku Munawir). The four Undangs of Sungei Ujong, Jelebu, Johol, and Rembau and the Tunku Besar Tampin, each bear the style of Yang Teramat Mulia. These offices are held for life, subject to the abdication and removal provisions of the state constitution and, in the of Undangs, the adat of the respective Luak.

The state's constitution proclaims the Yang di-Pertuan Besar, Undang of Sungei Ujong, Undang of Jelebu, Undang of Johol, Undang of Rembau and Tengku Besar Tampin are vested with the Executive Power of the state, are the Head of the Religion of Islam in the state and are the fountain of all honour and dignity for the state. The current Yang di-Pertuan Besar is Muhriz of Negeri Sembilan.

Unlike Malaysia's eight other Royal Malay states, the Ruler of Negeri Sembilan is elected to his office by the territorial chiefs or Ruling Chiefs of the state. These Ruling Chiefs are titled Undang. Only four of the Undangs have the right to vote in the election for the Ruler of the State. They are:

Luak (District)	Title	Undang (Ruler)	Reign	Ref.
Sungei Ujong	Dato' Klana Petra	Dato' Haji Mubarak bin Dohak (10th, claimant)	1993–2025 (disputed)	
Sungei Ujong	Dato' Klana Petra	Dato' Muhammad Faris bin Johari (11th, de jure)	2026–present (disputed)	
Sungei Ujong	Dato' Klana Petra	Abdul Rahman bin Limat (11th, claimant)	2026–present (disputed)	
Jelebu	Dato' Mendika Menteri Akhirulzaman	Dato' Haji Maarof bin Mat Rashad (16th, claimant)	2019–2026 (disputed)	
Jelebu	Dato' Mendika Menteri Akhirulzaman	Dato' Azrin bin Khairi (17th, de jure)	2026–present (disputed)	
Johol	Dato' Johan Pahlawan Lela Perkasa Sitiawan	Dato' Haji Muhammed bin Abdullah	2016–present	
Rembau	Dato' Sedia Raja	Dato' Haji Abd Rahim bin Yassin (21th, claimant)	2024–2026 (disputed)	
Rembau	Dato' Sedia Raja	Dato' Hassan bin Ab Hamid (22th, de jure)	2026–present (disputed)	

The Undang themselves cannot stand for election, and their choice of Ruler is limited to a male Muslim who is Malay and also a "lawfully begotten descendant of Raja Radin ibni Raja Lenggang".

=== Executive ===
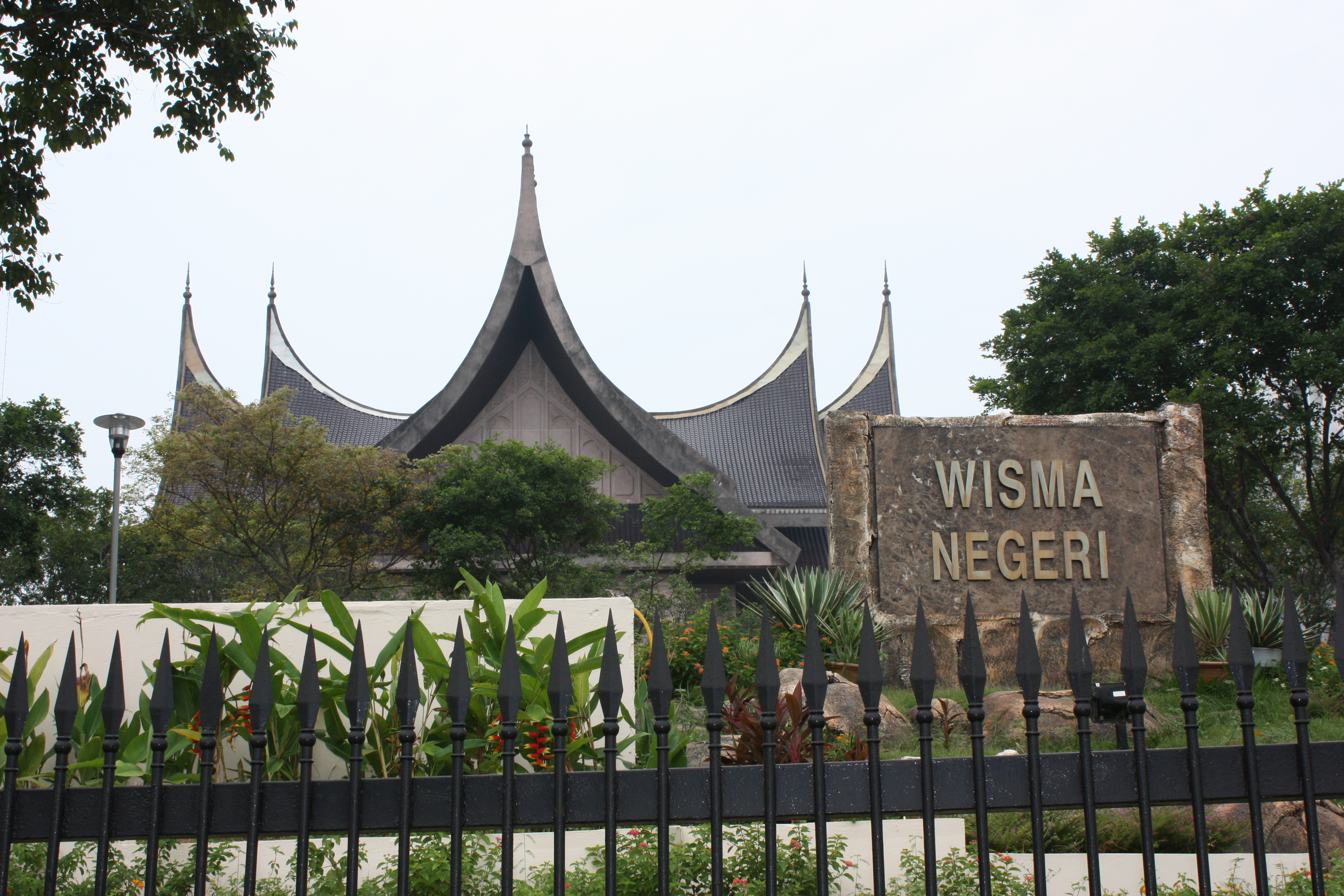
Wisma Negeri, Seremban

The State Executive Council consists of the Menteri Besar (Chief Minister), who is its chairman, and ten other members. The Menteri Besar and the other members of the council are appointed by the Yang Di-Pertuan Besar from the members of the State Assembly of the governing party or coalition. The current Menteri Besar of the state is Ismail Lasim.

=== Legislature ===
The unicameral Negeri Sembilan State Legislative Assembly is the state legislature of Negeri Sembilan. It consists of 36 members who represent single-member constituencies throughout the state. Elections are held no more than five years apart, and are usually conducted simultaneously with elections to the federal parliament. The Assembly convenes at the Wisma Negeri in the state capital, Seremban.

Affiliation	Coalition/Party Leader	Status	Seats	
Affiliation	Coalition/Party Leader	Status	2026 election	Current
Barisan Nasional; Perikatan Nasional	Ismail Lasim	Government	25	25
Pakatan Harapan	Arul Kumar Jambunathan	Opposition	11	11
Government majority			14	14

=== Administrative divisions ===
On the administrative level, Negeri Sembilan consists of seven districts that corresponds to seven local government areas, which in turn are divided into 61 mukims.

Districts in Negeri Sembilan
Map of Negeri Sembilan with districts
UPI Code	District	Seat	Area (km^{2})	Mukims	Population (2020)
0501	Jelebu	Kuala Klawang	1,349.89	8	46,026
0502	Kuala Pilah	Kuala Pilah	1,090.40	11	70,324
0503	Port Dickson	Port Dickson	572.35	5	128,657
0504	Rembau	Rembau	415.12	17	47,278
0505	Seremban	Seremban	935.02	8	692,407
0506	Tampin	Tampin	878.69	7	88,101
0507	Jempol	Bandar Seri Jempol	1,490.87	5	127,181
05	Total	Seremban	6,732.34	61	1,199,974

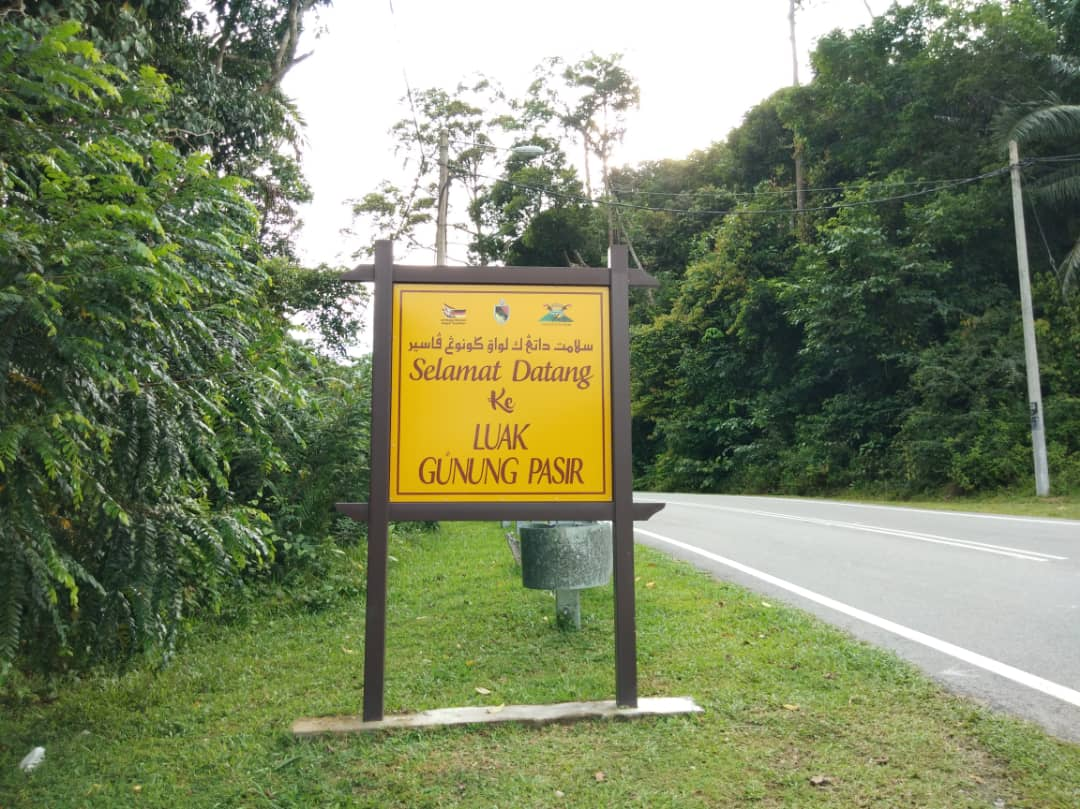
Signboard on the entrance into the Luak of Gunung Pasir, near Seri Menanti

==== List of local authorities ====
- Seremban City Council
- Port Dickson Municipal Council
- Jempol Municipal Council
- Jelebu District Council
- Kuala Pilah District Council
- Rembau District Council
- Tampin District Council

=== Traditional districts ===
Traditionally, the state is also organised into 14 customary domains known as luaks. There are major domains, headed by an Undang, which are: Sungai Ujong, Rembau, Jelebu, Johol, as well as Tampin, which is instead headed by a Tunku Besar. The major domains (except Tampin) are thus known as Luak Berundang.

There are also domains, which are part of the royal domain of Tanah Mengandung, surrounding the royal seat of Seri Menanti. The domains are Ulu Muar, Terachi, Ineh, Jempol and Gunung Pasir. These domains are headed by a penghulu.

There are also four minor luaks that are under protection of neighbouring major luaks:

- Gemencheh, Ayer Kuning and Pasir Besar (Gemas), protectorates of Johol; and
- Linggi (near Port Dickson), a protectorate of Sungai Ujong.

Only the four Undangs and the Tunku Besar of Tampin are involved in the selection of the Yang di-Pertuan Besar, the ruler of the state.

Luak	Subluak	Administrative district	Parliamentary constituency
Sungai Ujong	Sungai Ujong	Seremban District; Port Dickson District	P.128 Seremban; P.130 Rasah; P.132 Port Dickson; P.131 Rembau
Sungai Ujong	Linggi	Port Dickson District	P.132 Port Dickson
Jelebu		Jelebu District	P.126 Jelebu
Rembau		Rembau District	P.131 Rembau
Johol	Johol	Kuala Pilah District; Jempol District	P.129 Kuala Pilah; P.127 Jempol
Johol	Gemencheh Ayer Kuning; Pasir Besar (Gemas)	Tampin District	P.133 Tampin
Tampin		Tampin District	P.133 Tampin
Tanah Mengandung	Ulu Muar Ineh/Inas; Terachi; Gunung Pasir	Kuala Pilah District	P.129 Kuala Pilah
Tanah Mengandung	Jempol	Jempol District	P.127 Jempol

== Demographics ==
Historical population
Year	Pop.	±%
1970	481,563	—
1980	551,442	+14.5%
1991	692,897	+25.7%
2000	829,774	+19.8%
2010	986,204	+18.9%
2020	1,199,974	+21.7%

=== Ethnicity ===
Negeri Sembilan has a total population of 1,098,500 as of 2015; the ethnic composition consisting of 622,000 Malays (56.6%) (mostly are Minangkabau descent), 20,700 other Bumiputras (1.9%), 234,300 Chinese (21.3%), 154,000 Indian (14%), 4,200 Others (0.4%), and 63,300 non-citizens (5.8%). The state has the highest percentage of Indians when compared to other Malaysian states. Up until today the state is known as the strongholds of Adat Perpatih in Malaysia.

=== Religion ===
Religion in Negeri Sembilan – 2010 Census
religion	percent
Islam	60.3%
Buddhism	21.2%
Hinduism	13.4%
Christianity	2.4%
Unknown / None	1.1%
No religion	0.8%
Chinese Ethnic Religion	0.5%
Others	0.3%

According to the 2010 census, the population of Negeri Sembilan is 60.3% Muslim, 21.2% Buddhist, 13.4% Hindu, 2.4% Christian, 1.1% of unknown affiliation, 0.8% non-religious, 0.5% Taoist or Chinese religion follower, and 0.3% of followers of other religions.

Statistics from the 2010 Census indicate that 92.9% of the Chinese population in Negeri Sembilan identify as Buddhists, with significant minority of adherents identifying as Christians (3.6%), practitioners of Chinese folk religions (1.9%) and Muslims (0.8%). The majority of the Indian population are Hindus (89.0%), with a significant minorities of numbers identifying as Christians (5.0%), Muslims (3.2%) and Buddhists (1.4%). The non-Malay Bumiputera community are predominantly Atheists (39.7%), with significant minorities identifying as Christians (28.3%) and Muslims (20.2%). All Malays are Muslims as defined by the Constitution of Malaysia.

=== Languages ===
Negeri Sembilan is a multiethnic state in which every ethnic group speak their respective languages and dialects. The Negeri Sembilanese people speak a unique variety of Malay known as Negeri Sembilan Malay or in their native language as Baso Nogoghi. It is not closely related to other varieties of Malay in Peninsular Malaysia but is more closely related with Malay varieties spoken in neighbouring Sumatra especially varieties of Minangkabau. Besides Malays, the Chinese community also speak their languages and dialects. Orang Asli peoples like Temuans speak a language closely related to Malay. Standard Malay is widely used throughout the state.

Tamil (mother tongue to Indian Tamils and Ceylon Tamils) is used as a lingua franca among the other minor Indian communities. Besides, a small number of Telugu, Malayalam and Punjabi exist in the towns of Negeri Sembilan.

== Economy ==
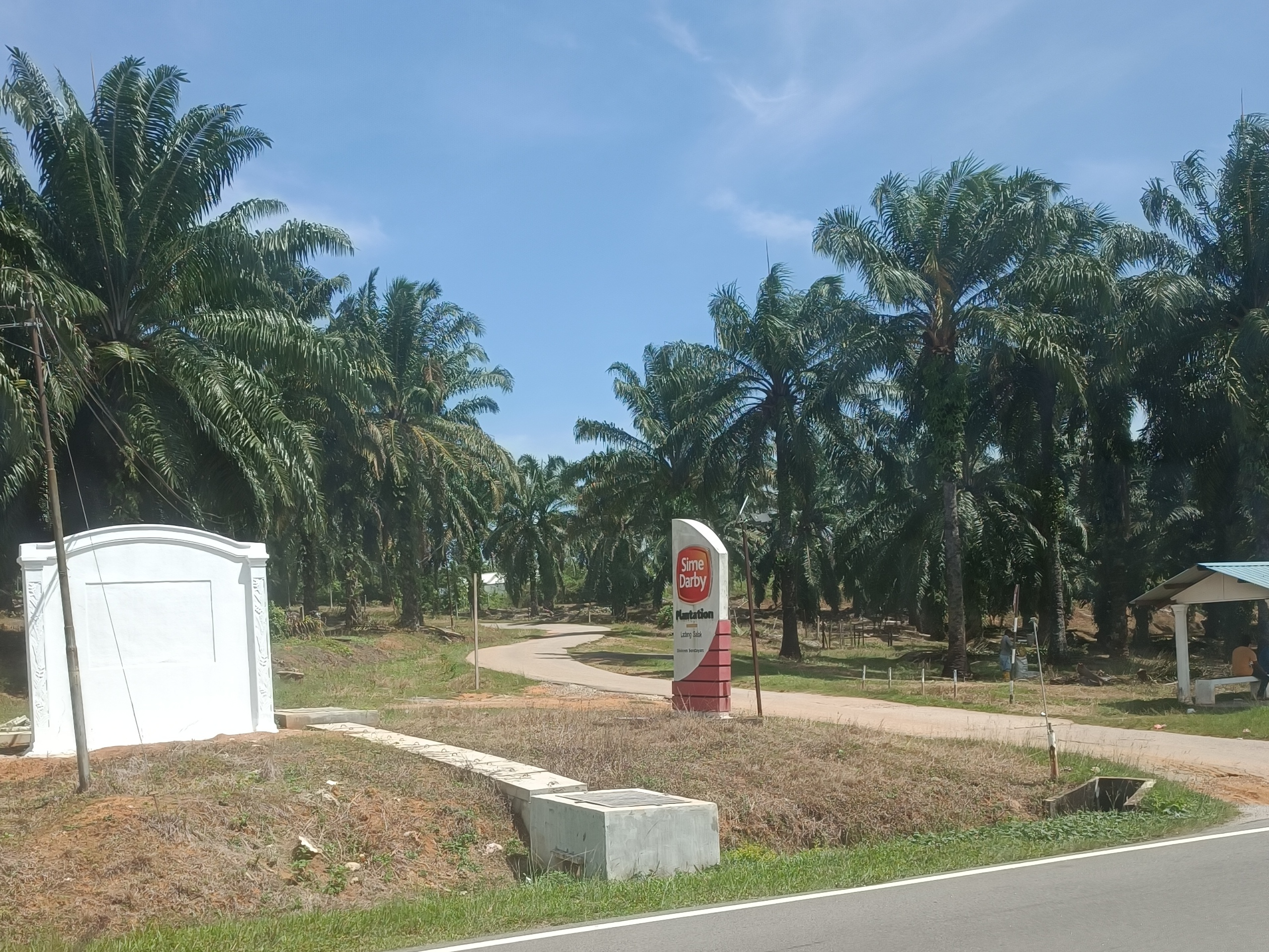
Sime Darby oil palm estate in Port Dickson District

The state's manufacturing sector contributes almost half of the state's gross domestic product (GDP), followed by services and tourism (40.3%), agriculture (6%), construction (2.2%) and mining (0.3%). Manufacturing activities include electrical supplies and electronics, textiles, furniture, chemicals, machinery, metal works and rubber products. The main industrial areas in Negeri Sembilan include Senawang, Bandar Sri Sendayan, Sungai Gadut, Bandar Enstek and Nilai in Seremban, Tanah Merah in Port Dickson and Chembong in Rembau. Notable companies also set up plants in Negeri Sembilan, such as Kellogg's, Dutch Lady, Ajinomoto and Coca-Cola in Bandar Enstek, Hino Motors in Bandar Sri Sendayan, Yakult in Seremban 2, Samsung SDI, Onsemi and NXP Semiconductors in Senawang, and Nestlé in Chembong. Nestlé's Chembong plant is also the largest Milo manufacturer in the world, as well as the company's largest global centre of excellence.

Negeri Sembilan is mainly an agricultural state. However, the establishment of several industrial estates enhanced the manufacturing sector as a significant contributor to the state economy. Two districts in the western half of the state – Seremban and Port Dickson – have been gazetted as part of the Malaysia Vision Valley, a 1,534 square kilometres (592 sq mi) new growth corridor conceived from the joint venture between Sime Darby and both the federal and state governments in 2015 as part of the National Transformation Agenda, the National Physical Plan, the Eleventh Malaysia Plan and the 2045 Negeri Sembilan Structural Plan, in order to evenly balancing the existing development in the neighbouring Klang Valley area, providing ample space for the southern extension of the Greater Kuala Lumpur area, as well as to transform Negeri Sembilan into a developed state by 2045. As of 2024, the MVV is now in its second iteration, and is still undergoing development. Meanwhile, districts east of the MVV – Rembau, Kuala Pilah, Tampin and Jempol – are yet to be developed into an agropolis, to boost foodstuff production in the state and national levels respectively.

The agricultural activity includes rubber and oil palm plantations, livestock, fruit orchards and vegetable farming. About 3,099 square kilometres are used for rubber and oil palm plantations.

== Culture ==
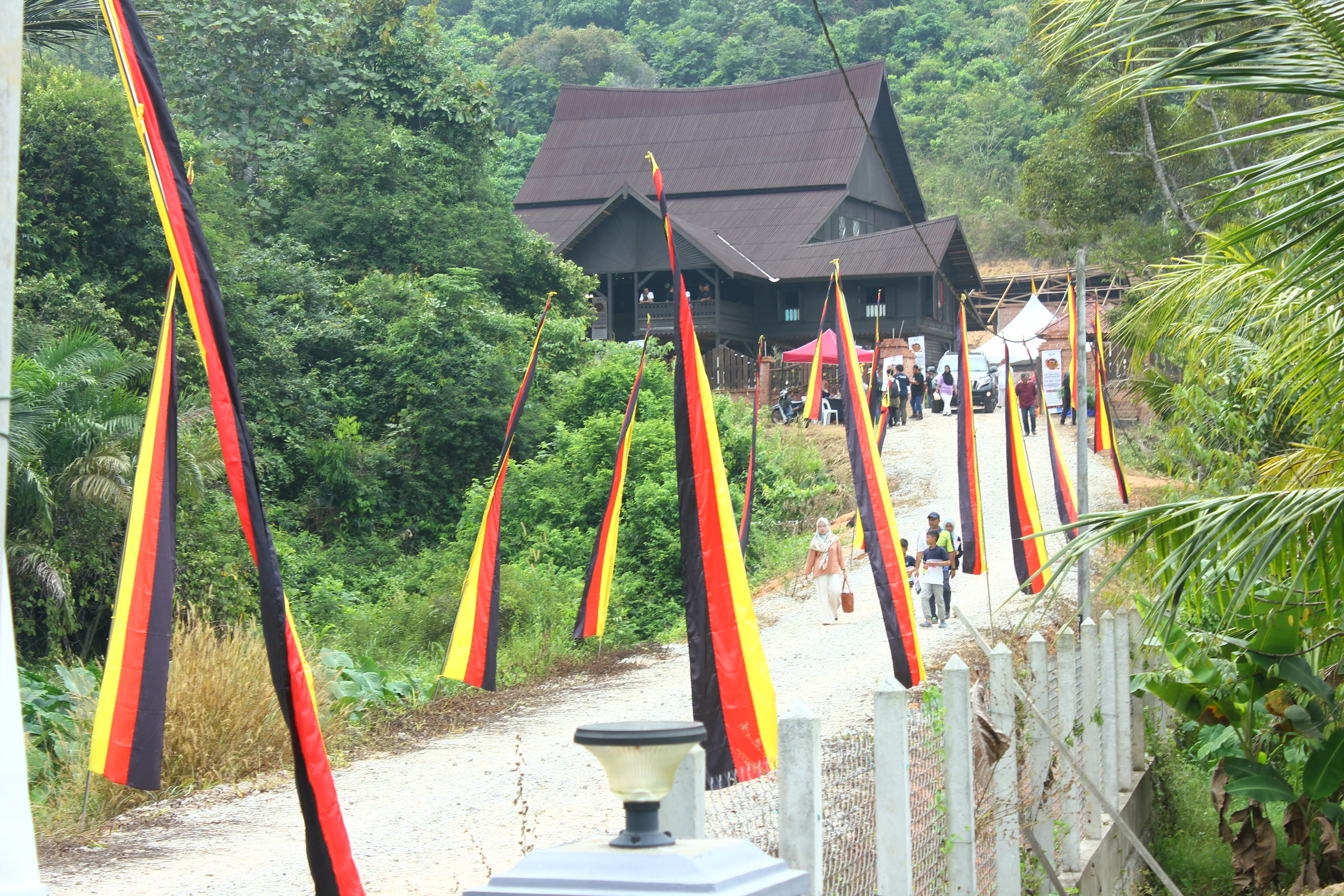
An adat perpatih ceremony in Kuala Pilah

The Minangkabau people brought with them a cultural heritage which is still preserved and practised today as the adat perpatih, a matrilineal system of inheritance and administration that is unique to the state, where the husband is the head of the household and inheritance passes from mother to daughter. The Minangkabaus in Negeri Sembilan are divided into twelve suku (clans). Each of these suku is led by a chief, known as the Lembaga. Each suku is broken down into subunits known as the Perut, where each of them is led by a chief, either known as a Buapak (male) or Ibu Soko (female). Both the Buapak and Ibu Soko play a vital role as people to refer to regarding the adat and religious matters among the subordinates of the Perut, known as Anak Buah. Marriage between members of the same clan is forbidden. The twelve suku are known as the following, of which the names of each suku indicates their area of origin:

- Biduanda (Dondo)
- Seri Lemak (Solomak)
- Seri Melenggang (Somolenggang)
- Anak Aceh
- Anak Melaka (Anak Melako)
- Tiga Nenek (Tigo Nenek)
- Tiga Batu (Tigo Batu)
- Tanah Datar
- Batu Hampar (Tompa)
- Payakumbuh (Payokumboh)
- Batu Belang (Batu Bolang)
- Mungkal (Mungka)

The Minangkabau influence in the state can be found in dances and food as well.

Traditional buildings in Negeri Sembilan are grouped into two different architectures: one directly Minangkabau with familiar lengkung or gonjong ("curved") buffalo horn motifs, and another featuring flatter or lentik roofs in villages of a "Malay" motif adopted by Minangkabau generations intermarrying with Jakun tribes; the lentik houses were based on traditional houses found in Kampar, Riau where the Minangkabau migrants stopped first.

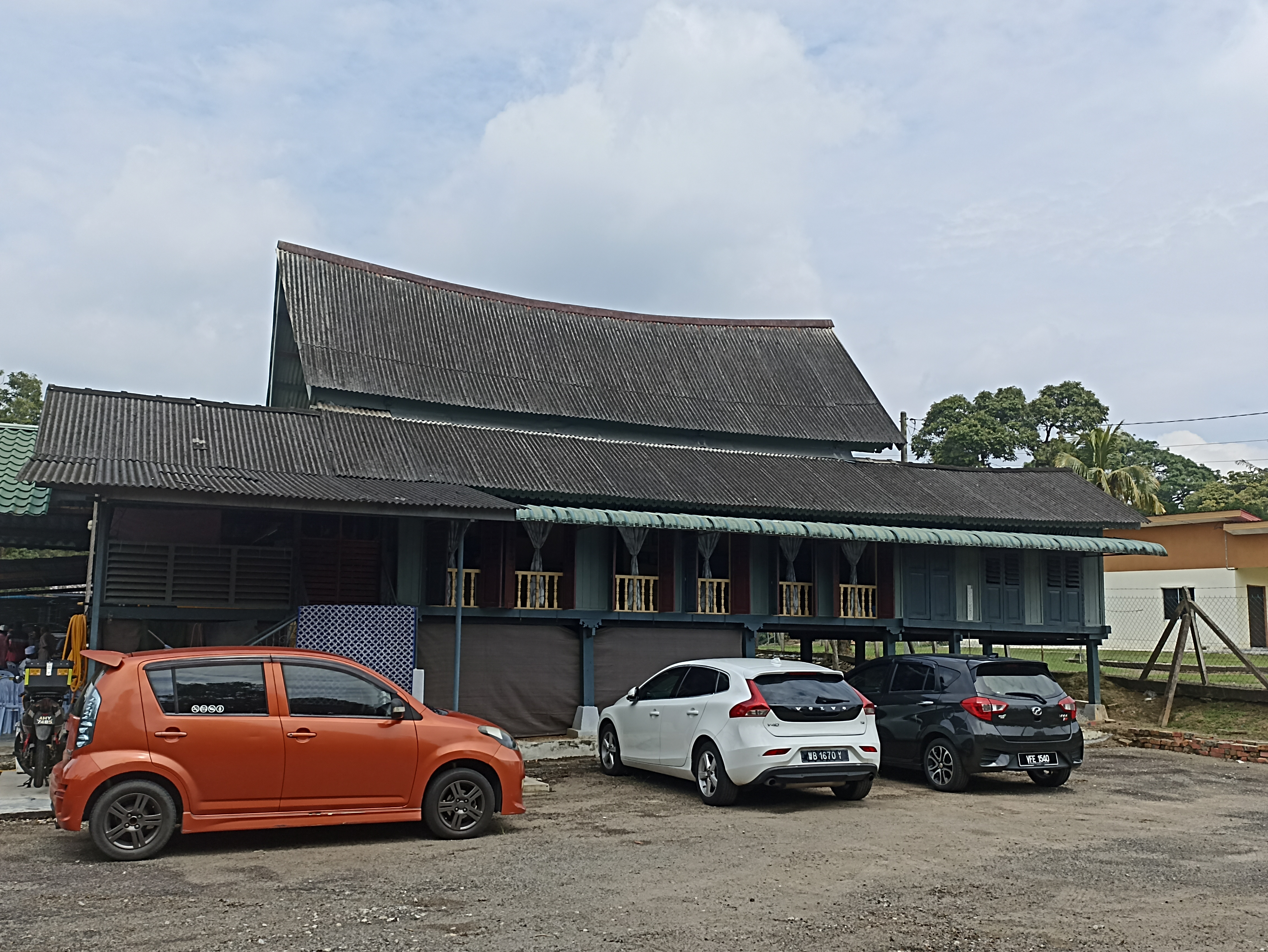
A kampung house in Rantau exhibiting the Malay lentik roof

=== Performing arts ===
Negeri Sembilan also has traditional music like the Caklempong, Dikir Rebana, Tumbuk Kalang, and Bongai.

The musical instruments used to bear some semblance to Sumatra, the ancestral home of the Minangkabau people. Dances like the tarian lilin (candle dance) and rentak kuda (the beat of the horse) are popular in Negeri Sembilan and the coordinated movements of the dancers in their colorful costumes in the Tarian Piring and the upbeat tempo of Tarian Randai. Each beat, rhythm and movement in these dances combines to form a story, maybe of a bygone myth or simply a reflection of the lifestyles of another era.

They are usually performed at traditional festivities, cultural events and dinner-cum-cultural shows.

=== Mantai ===
Mantai is celebrated in Negeri Sembilan on the eves of Ramadan, Eid al-Fitr and Eid al-Adha.

== Transportation ==
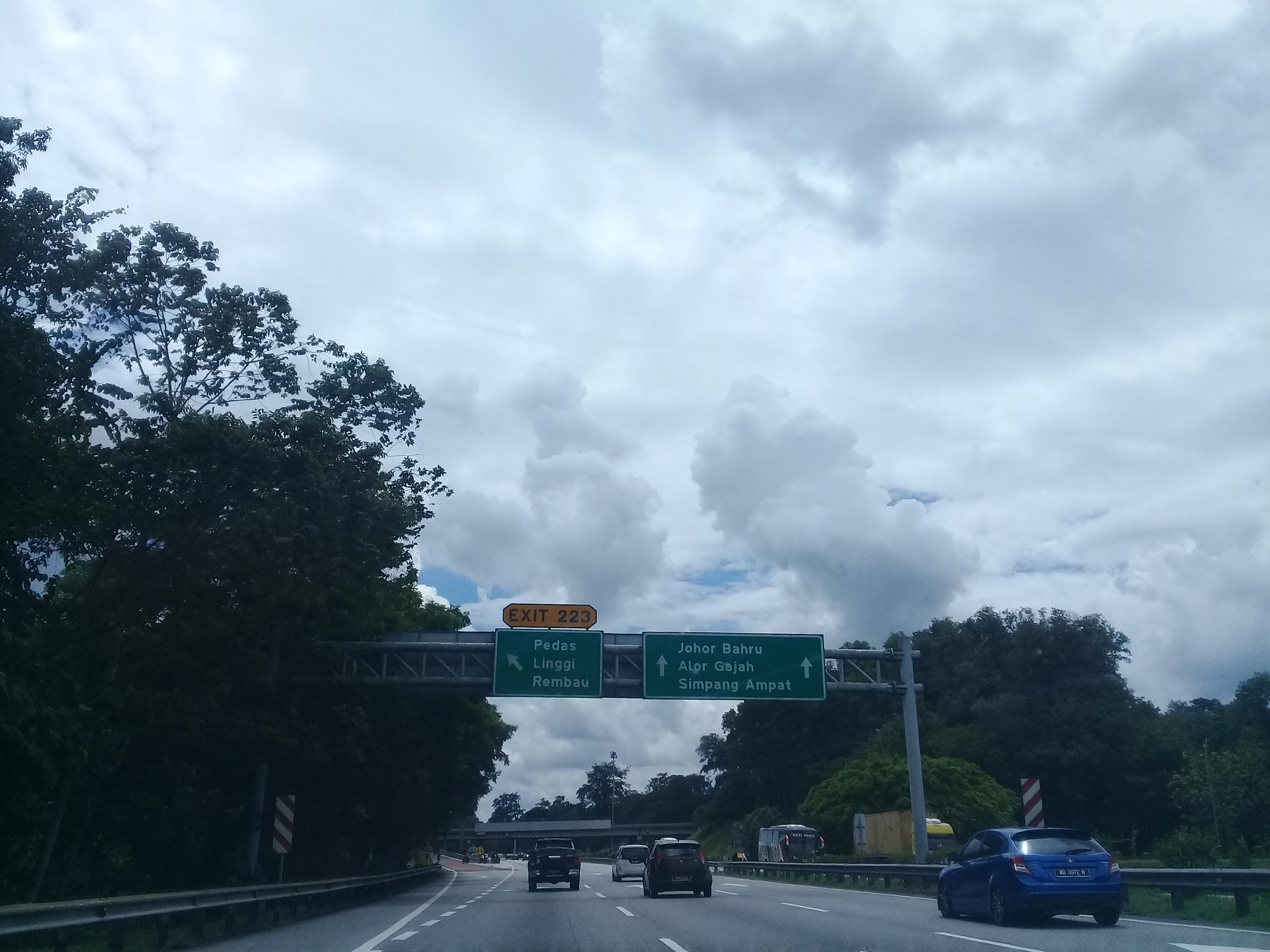
Pedas-Linggi interchange, on the North-South Expressway near Rembau

As in most other Asian cities, driving is the main form of transportation in the state. there are three expressways serving the state, which are the PLUS Highway, LEKAS Highway and Seremban–Port Dickson Highway. There is the Seremban Inner Ring Road that is a multi-lane ring road highway that connects to the expressways. Public transportation covers a variety of transport modes such as bus, rail and taxi.

Free bus in Seremban

For the bus services, it is operated by myBAS in the state. There are also 3 lines of free bus services in the Seremban and Jempol districts funded by the state government, now operated by MARA Liner. MARA Liner also operated 4 rural routes in Rembau and Tampin districts.

Seremban has a main bus station – Terminal One – which connects Seremban with major places in Negeri Sembilan such as Kuala Pilah, Bahau, Rembau and Malaysia such as Alor Setar, Ipoh and Melaka. All bus companies that provide bus services are based here.

KTMB's Seremban railway station

For the rail services, Seremban Railway Station is the main station to the state capital. Seremban and part of the Klang Valley Integrated Transit System, while Gemas Railway Station in Tampin District is the interchange between West Coast and East Coast Line. The KTM Komuter, a commuter rail service, was introduced in 1995 as the first rail transit system to provide local rail services from Negeri Sembilan to Kuala Lumpur and the surrounding Klang Valley suburban areas. KTM Komuter's 175 km (109 mi) network in the Central Sector has 53 stations. It consists of two cross-city routes, namely the Port Klang Line (Tanjung Malim to Port Klang) and Seremban Line (Batu Caves to Pulau Sebang/Tampin).

There are no civil airports in the state, while the nearest airport, Kuala Lumpur International Airport (KLIA) at Sepang, Selangor can be accessed via shuttle bus between Nilai Komuter station to the airport.

== Cuisine ==
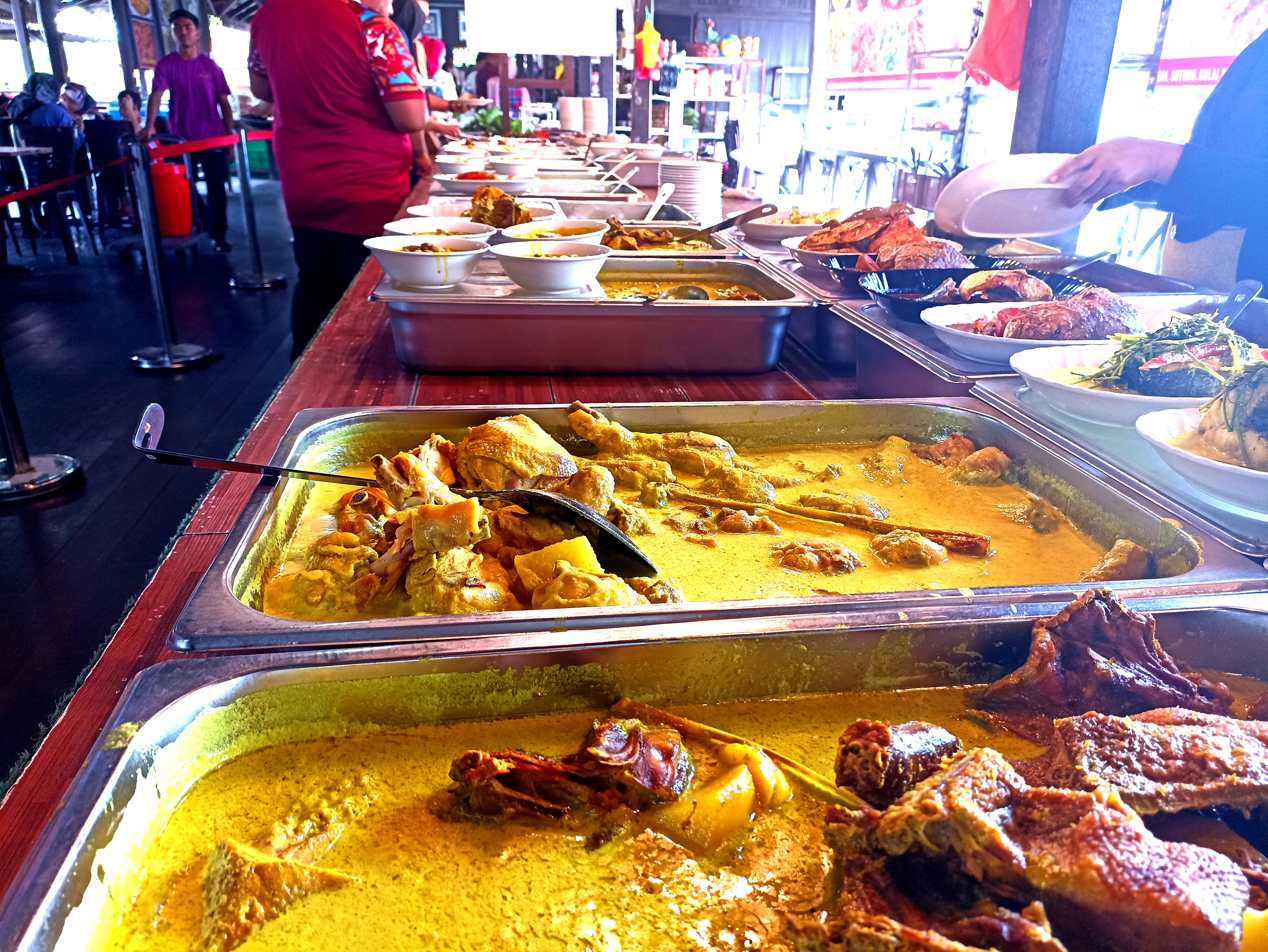
Traditional Negri fare at a restaurant in Terachi

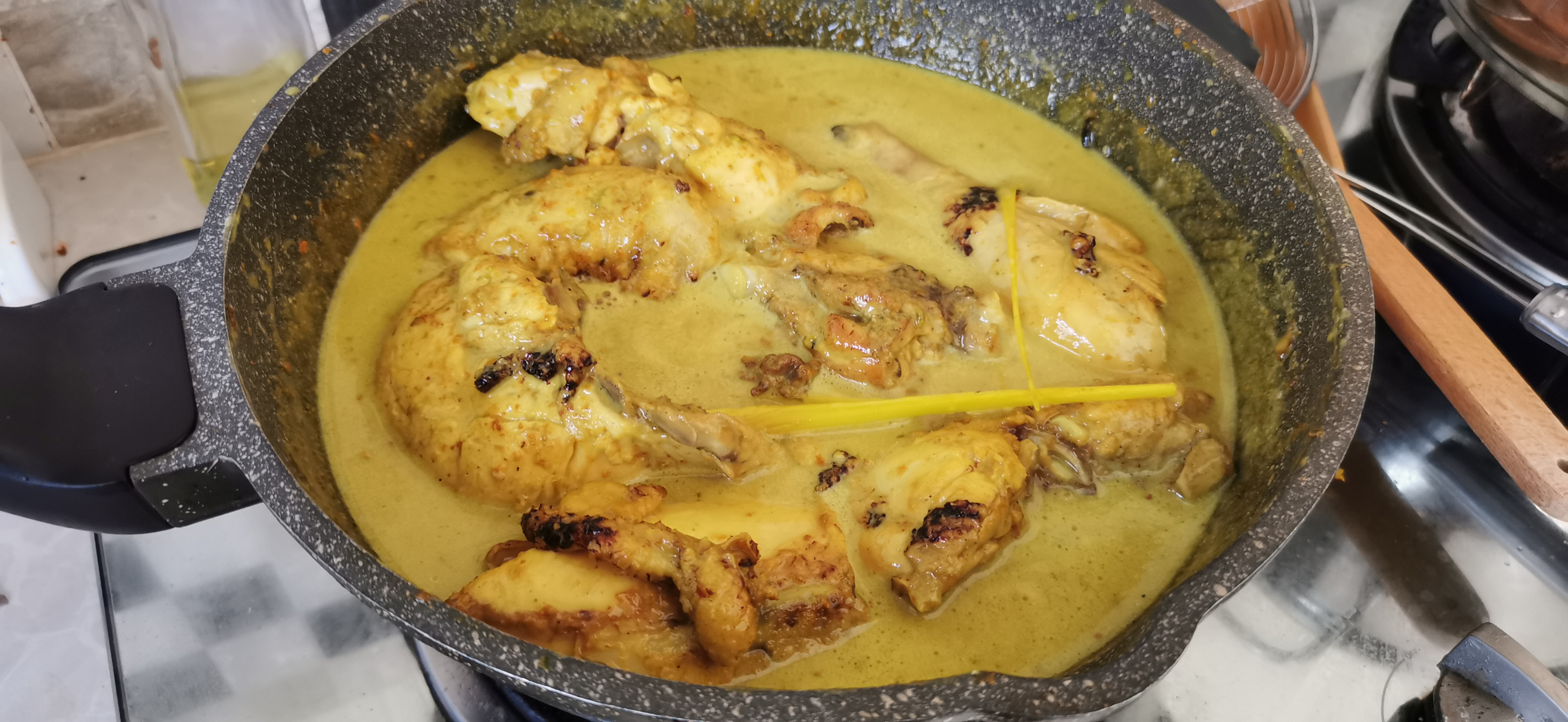
Masak lemak lada api is an iconic dish from the state.

Traditional Negri food is generally very hot and spicy, as one of the ingredients used is the cili padi, one of the hottest types of chili peppers. Masak lemak lada api, a type of gulai made with turmeric and cili padi-infused coconut milk (santan), is a trademark dish in the state's cuisine. The Negeri Sembilanese are also known for their penchant for smoked foods (known as salai in Malay), with examples include sembilang salai (smoked catfish) and ayam salai (smoked chicken) and these can also be cooked masak lemak lada api-style.

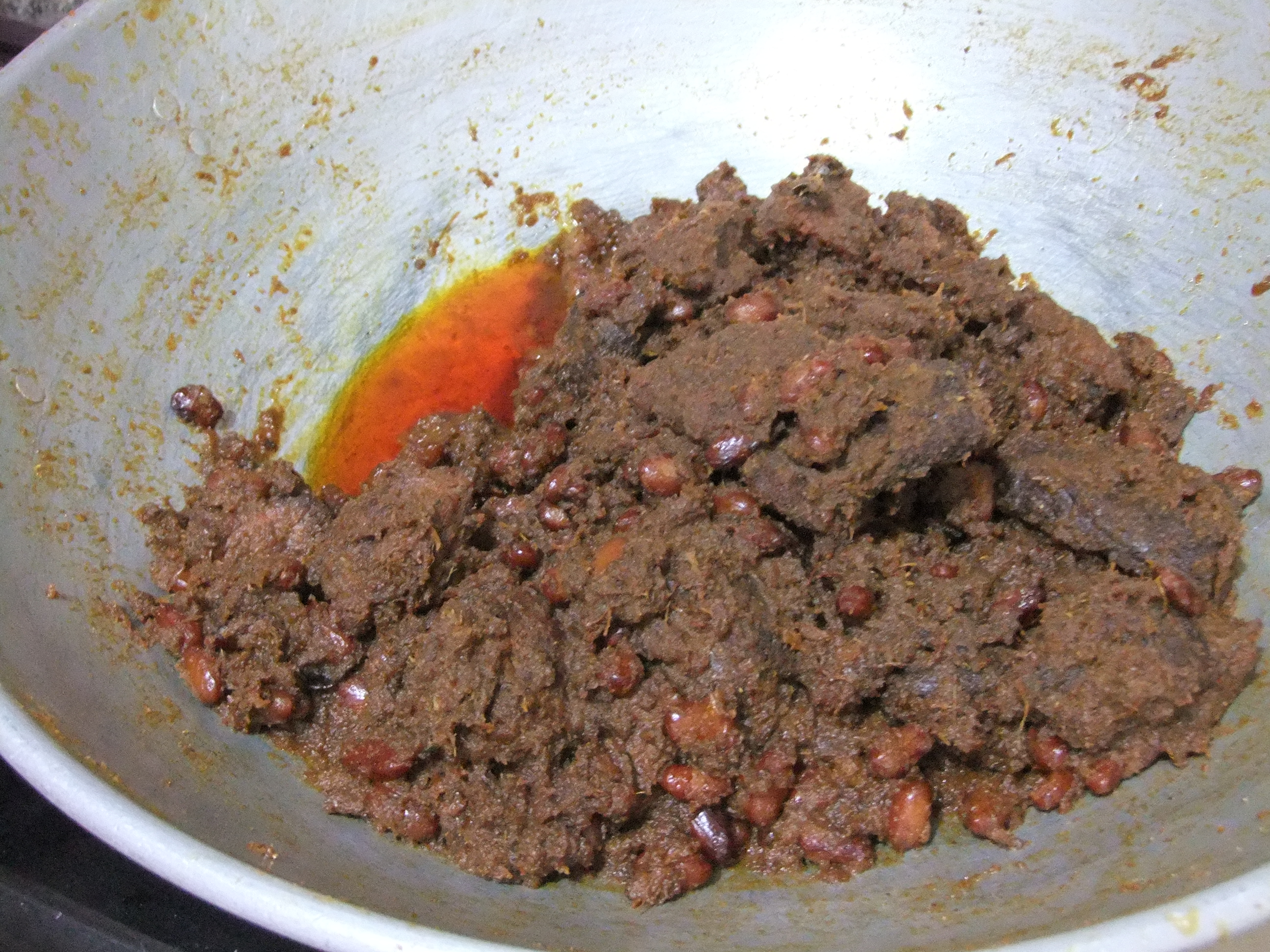
Rendang

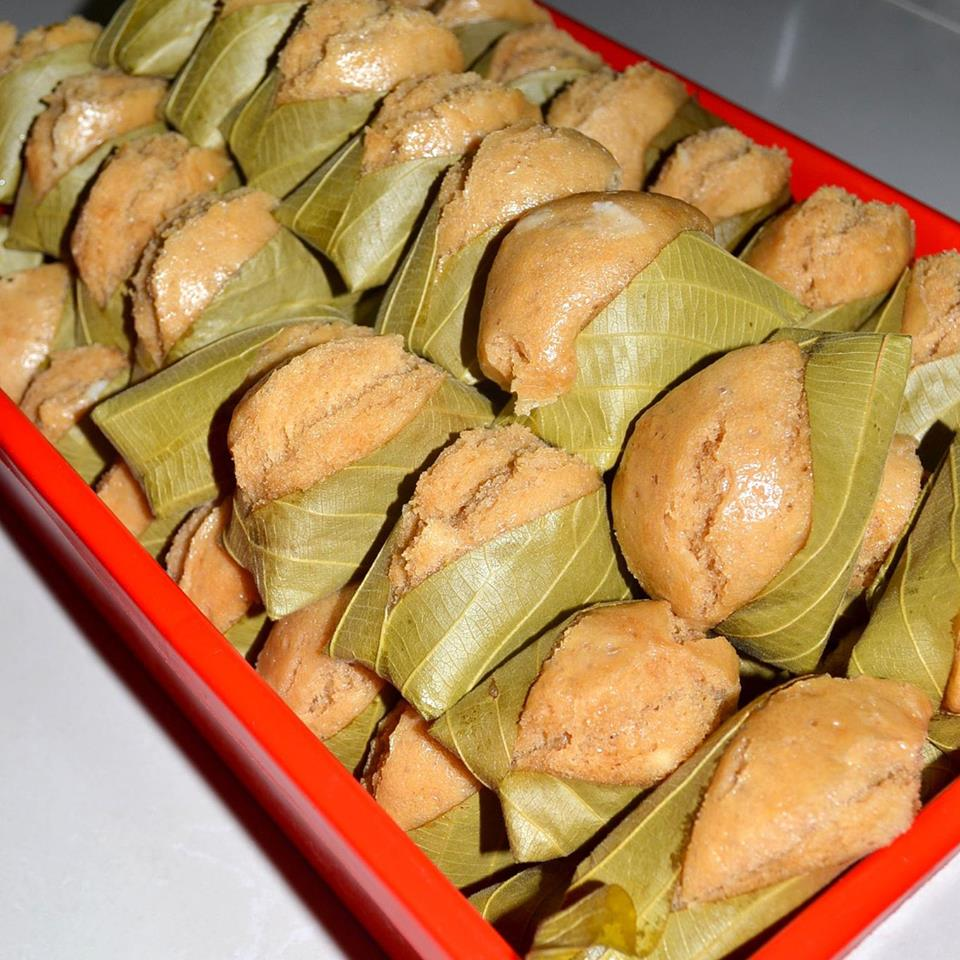
Apam Johol

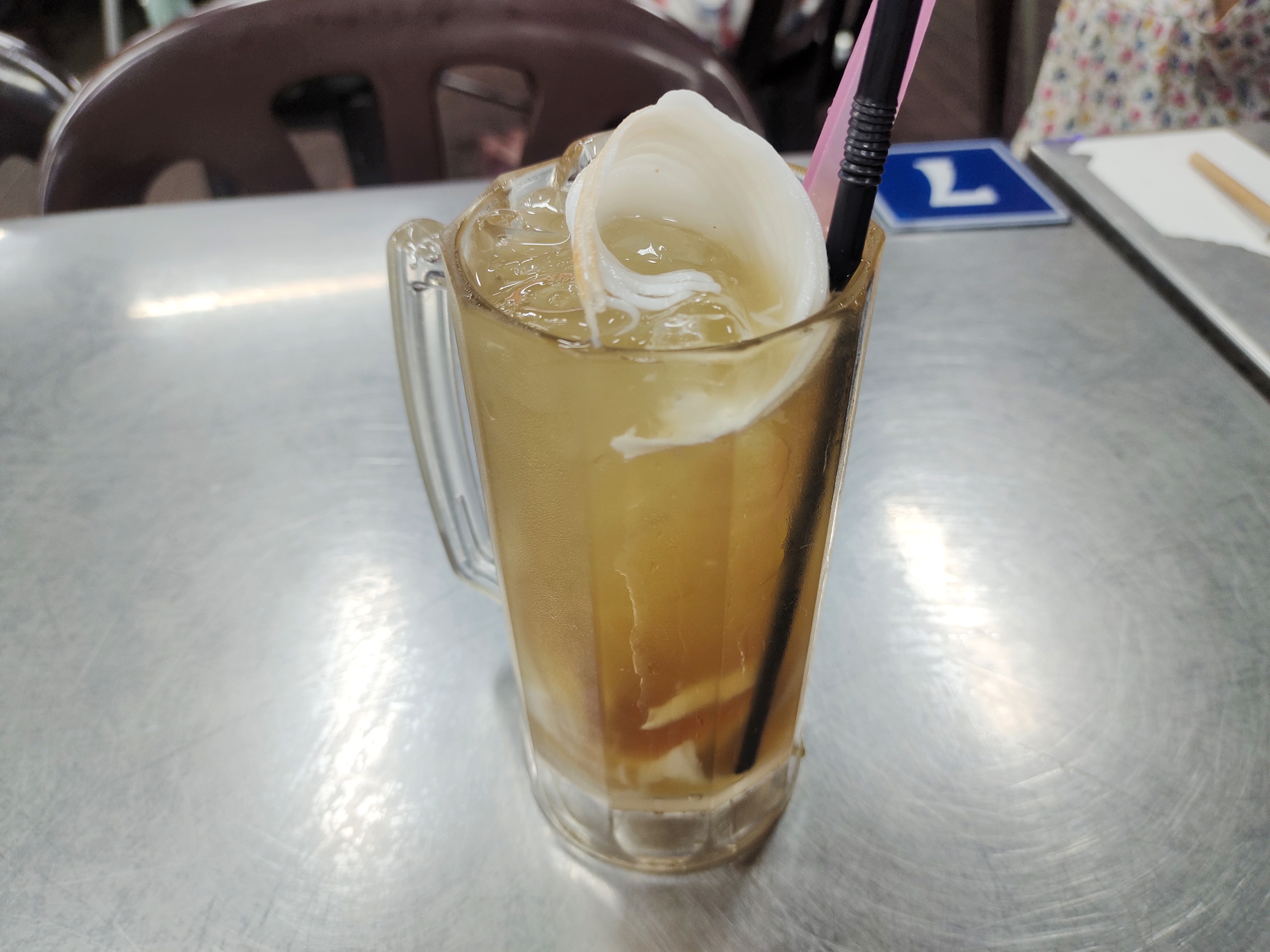
Jando Pulang

Rendang, which is a rich dish of dry braised meat with herbs, spices and coconut milk, is also well known in Negeri Sembilan, and there are variations of it according to the districts where the rendang originated, such as rendang maman from Gemencheh in Tampin District, made with maman leaves. Another Negeri Sembilan speciality is lemang, glutinous rice cooked in coconut milk in a bamboo stem over an open fire. This is normally served with rendang.

== Tourism ==
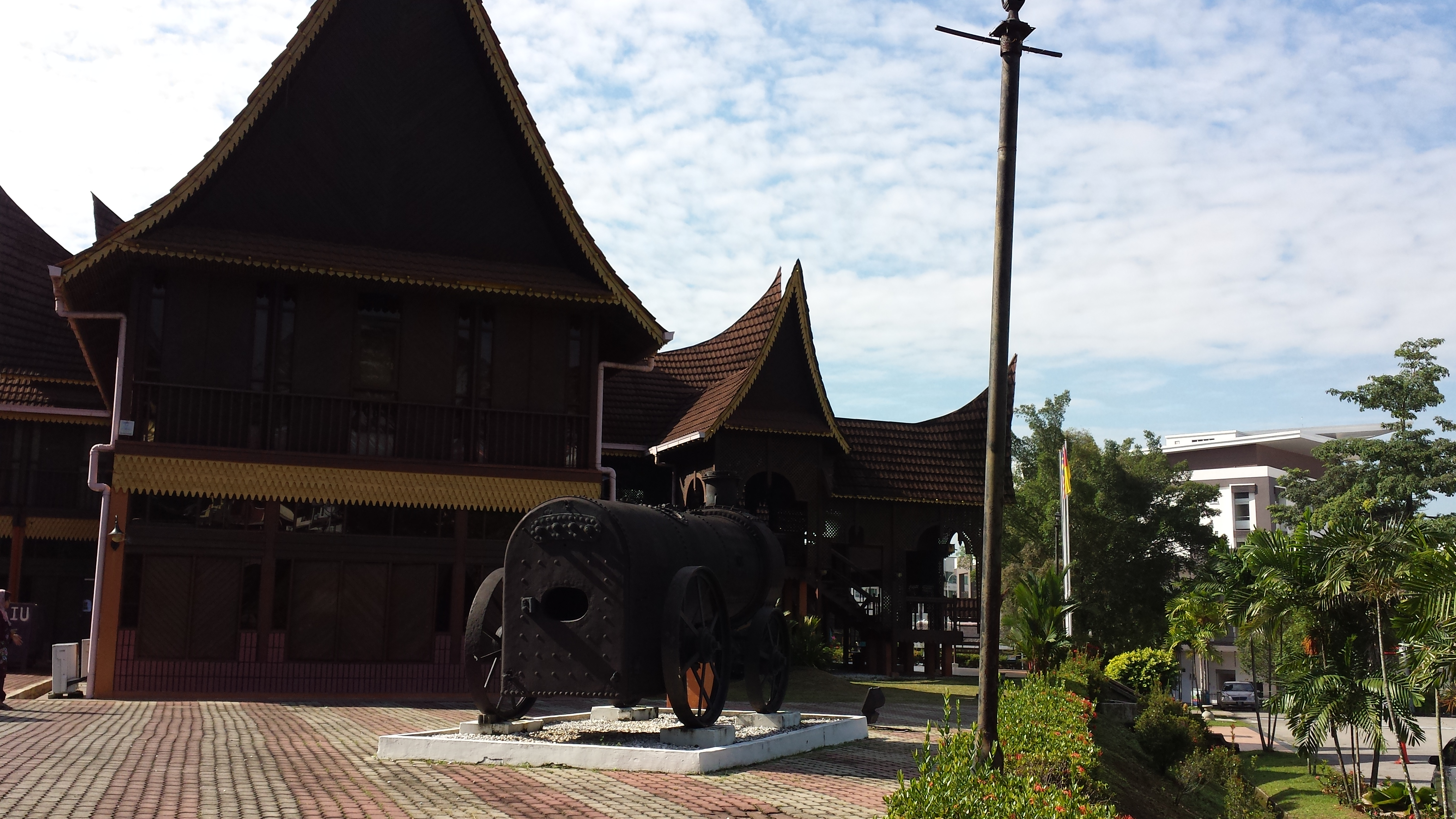
State Museum, Seremban

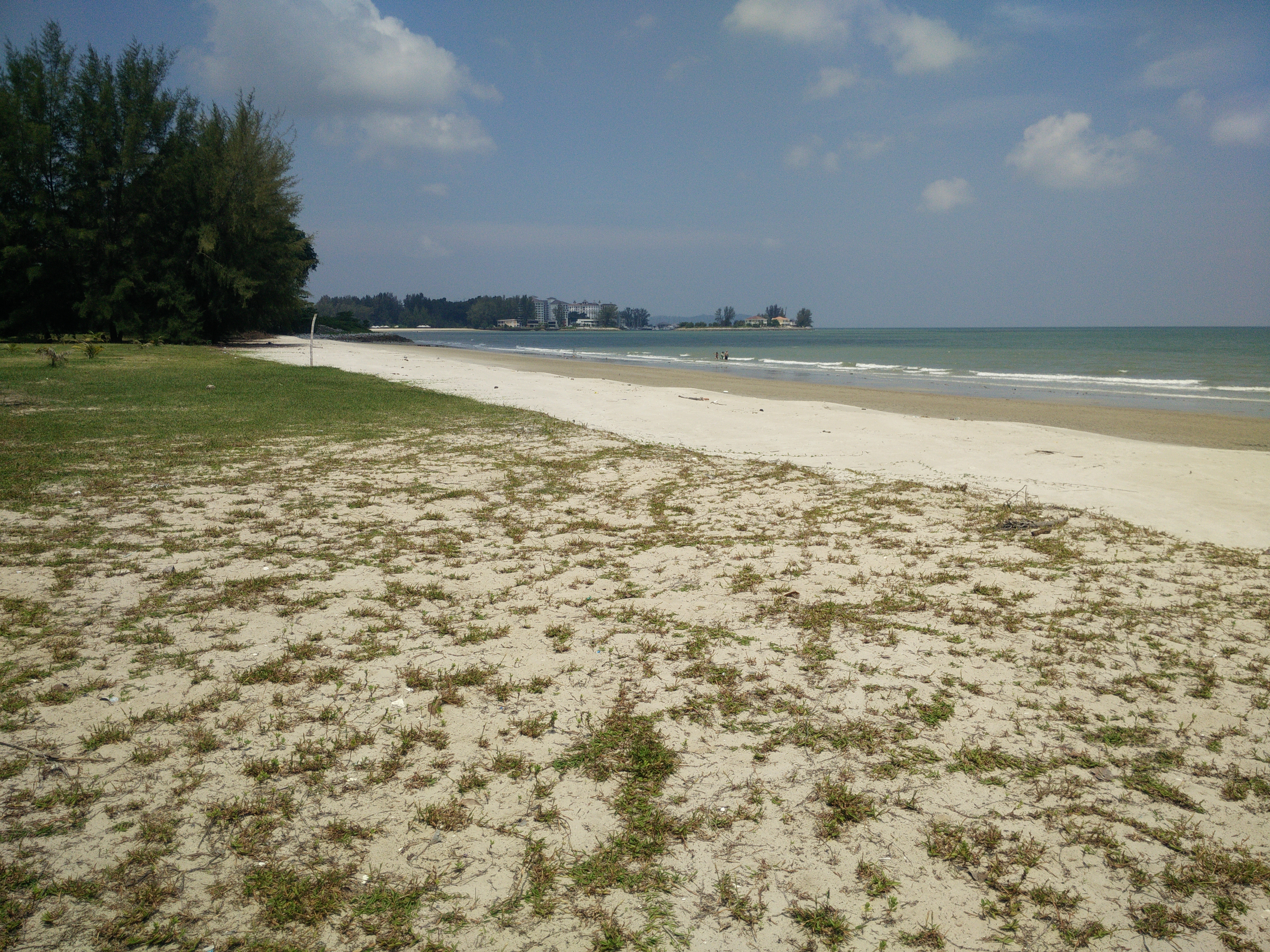
A beach in Port Dickson

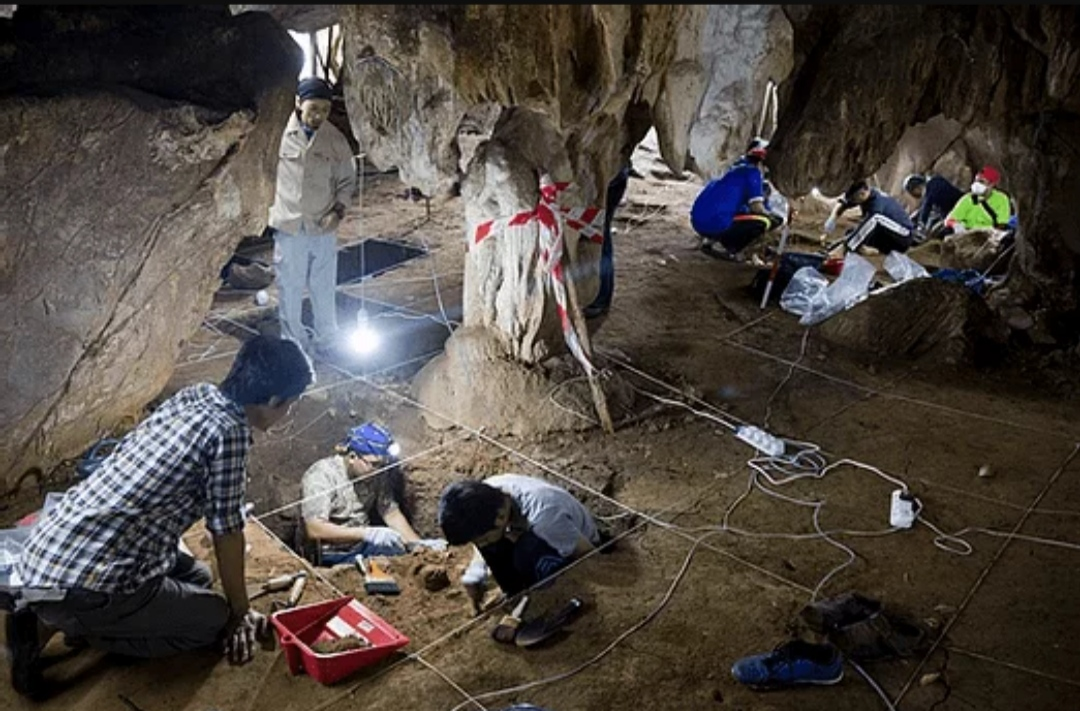
Excavation works in Gua Pelangi, Pasoh Caves Complex

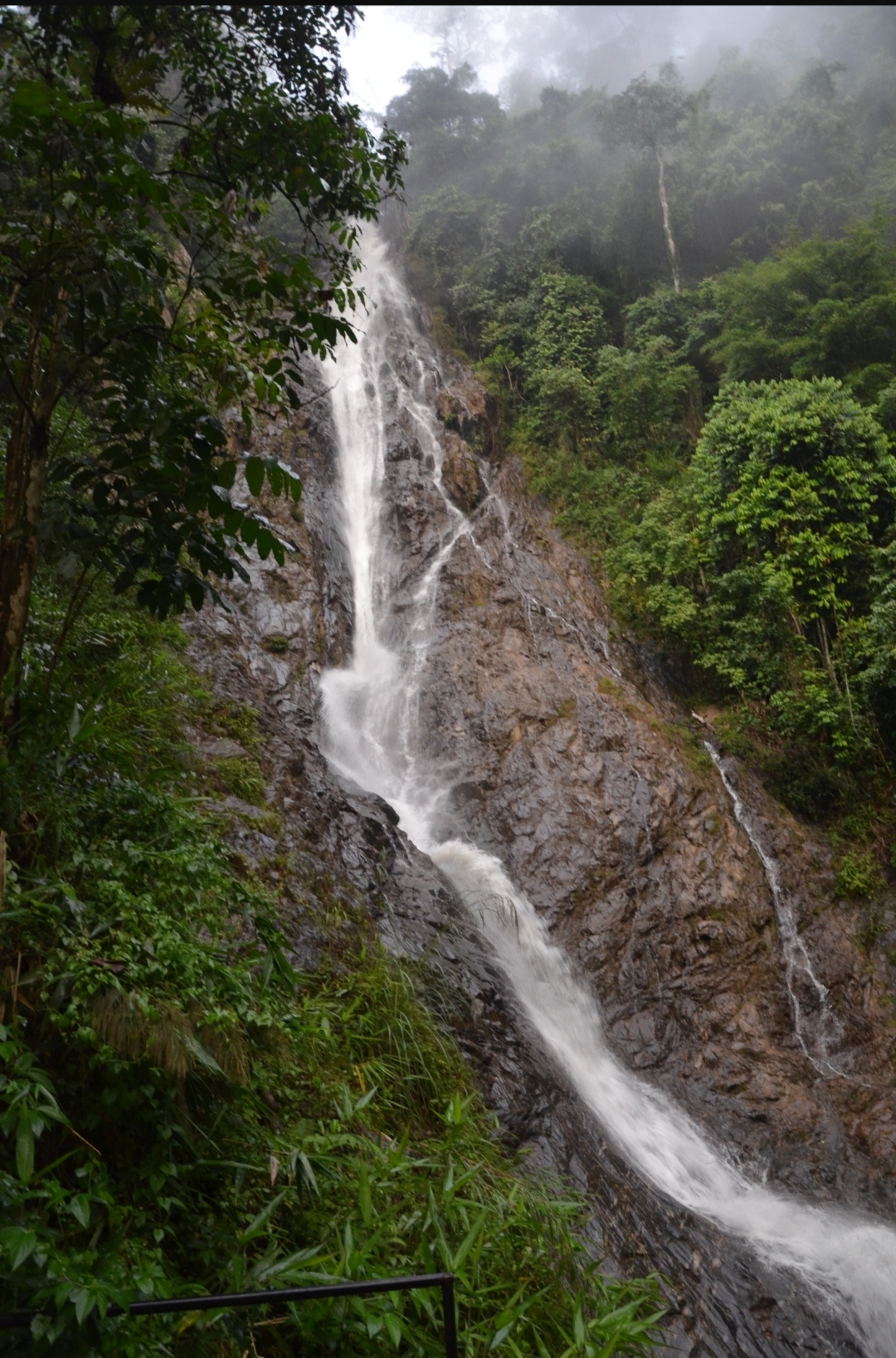
Lata Kijang Waterfall, Kenaboi State Park

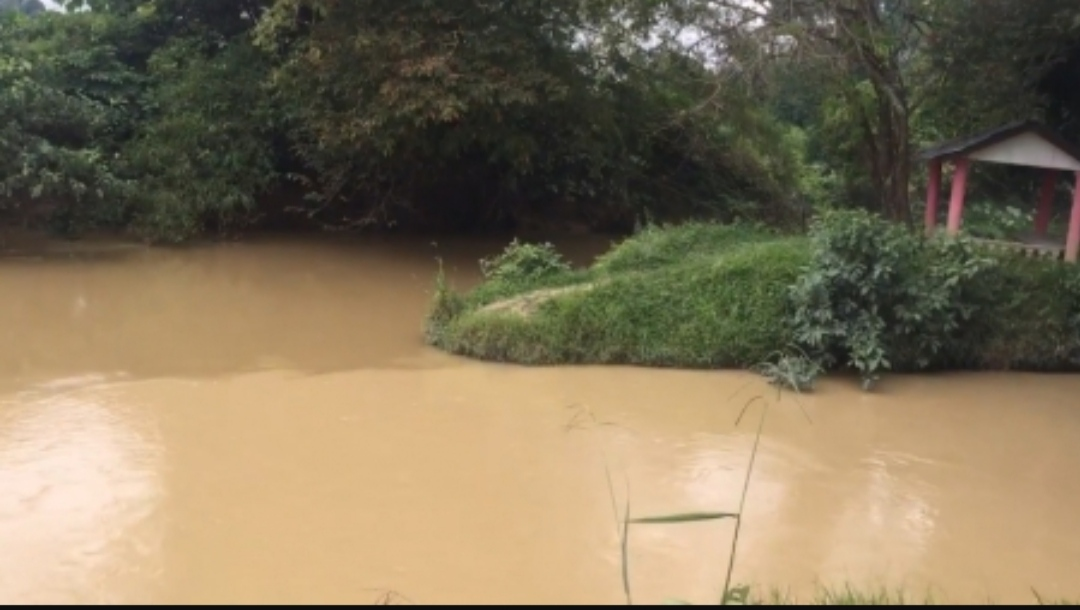
Penarikan Portage site, Bahau

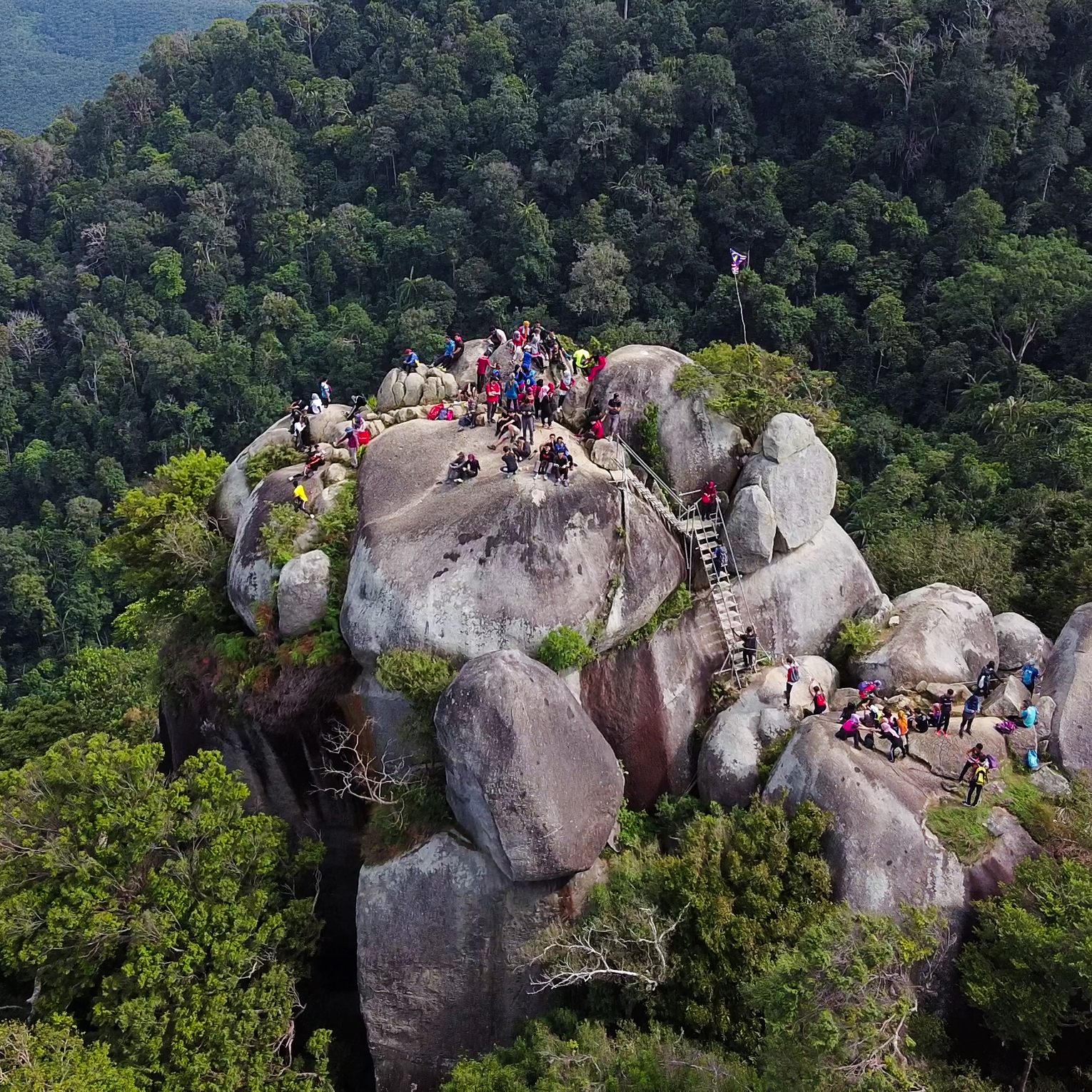
Mount Datuk

Attractions in Negeri Sembilan include:

- Galeri Diraja Tuanku Ja'afar – A gallery in Seremban, showcasing the life of former Negeri Sembilan Yang di-Pertuan Besar, Tuanku Ja'afar.
- Port Dickson – A famous weekend retreat for city dwellers, said to have been named after British officer John Frederick Dickson in 1889. Port Dickson is known for its high-end hotel establishments, army bases, pristine beaches facing the Strait of Malacca.
- Seri Menanti Royal Museum – Originally a palace for Negeri Sembilan's royal family until 1992, this five-storey wooden palace was built using no nails or screws. The palace exhibits costumes, weaponry, bed chambers as well as documents on the royal lineage on display in the museum
- Army Museum – Located in the Port Dickson suburb of Sirusa, it is the largest military museum in Malaysia. The Army Museum (Malay: Muzium Tentera Darat) exhibits artefacts relating to the history of the Malaysian Army.
- Mount Datuk – Located in Rembau, this 884-metre peak provides a good work out and excellent views from the top, which also include the Strait of Malacca, visible from the peak on a clear day. It is easily accessible via a day trip from Kuala Lumpur.
- Mount Angsi – A 824 m (2,703 ft) peak, located on the border between Seremban and Kuala Pilah Districts which is a popular climbing spot .
- Lukut Fort and Museum – A museum which contains a Lukut Historical Gallery and other artefacts.
- Penarikan Portage – the spot close to Bahau town is Jalan Penarikan where boats were carried over the short gap between eastbound and westbound rivers of the Malay Peninsula allowing movement between both coasts of the peninsula. It is described as the first east–west land route in Malaysian history.
- Teratak Za'aba – A museum dedicated to Zainal Abidin Ahmad, a Malay scholar and linguist who contributed a lot in shaping the modern Malay language. It is located at his birthplace in Kampung Bukit Kerdas, Batu Kikir near Bahau.
- Megalithic sites – Negeri Sembilan is home to a number of megalithic sites of historical significance, such as in Terachi in Kuala Pilah District, Repah in Tampin District and the Pengkalan Kempas Historical Complex in Port Dickson District.
- Gemencheh Bridge (Sungai Kelamah) Memorial – A memorial to the site of the Battle of Gemas of World War II where Allied forces ambushed advancing Japanese troops.
- Gemas Railway Museum – Gemas, Tampin District is a town known for being located on the junction between the east coast and west coast lines of the Keretapi Tanah Melayu Berhad's (KTMB) railway network. Previously, the museum's building was the former Gemas railway station, which ceased operations in 2013 after 91 years of service, coincident to the completion of the new station building, as part of the electrification and double tracking of the Seremban-Gemas section of the West Coast Line.
- Pasoh Caves – Located in Pasoh Forest Reserve, Jelebu, the Pasoh Caves complex holds the distinction of being the southernmost karst cave in Peninsular Malaysia as well as the first Paleolithic site discovered in the southern region, following the discovery of some artefacts as old as 14,000 years, in an excavation conducted by the Science University of Malaysia (USM).
- Batu Maloi Cave – Located in Johol, Kuala Pilah District, the Batu Maloi Cave is a 2.4-kilometre long talus cave made up of fallen boulders of granite with a river flowing through it. Said to be the longest granite cave in Malaysia, and is popular among cavers.
- Kenaboi State Park – Located in Jelebu, Kenaboi State Park is nestled in the Titiwangsa Mountains. The nature reserve is the main entry point to the tallest mountain in Negeri Sembilan, Mount Besar Hantu (1,462 metres (4,797 ft)) and natural landmarks such as Lata Kijang, Lata Dinding and Lata Berungut.
- Mount Tampin – Located in Tampin in the southern corner of the state, Mount Tampin is the geographical southern terminus of the Titiwangsa Mountains, at an elevation of 764 metres (2,507 ft).

== Education ==
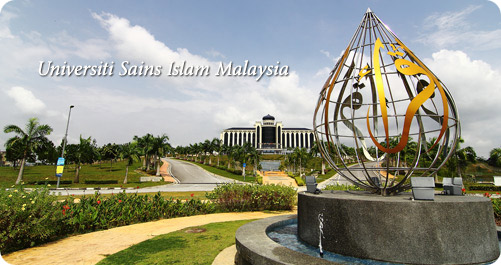
Universiti Sains Islam Malaysia, Nilai

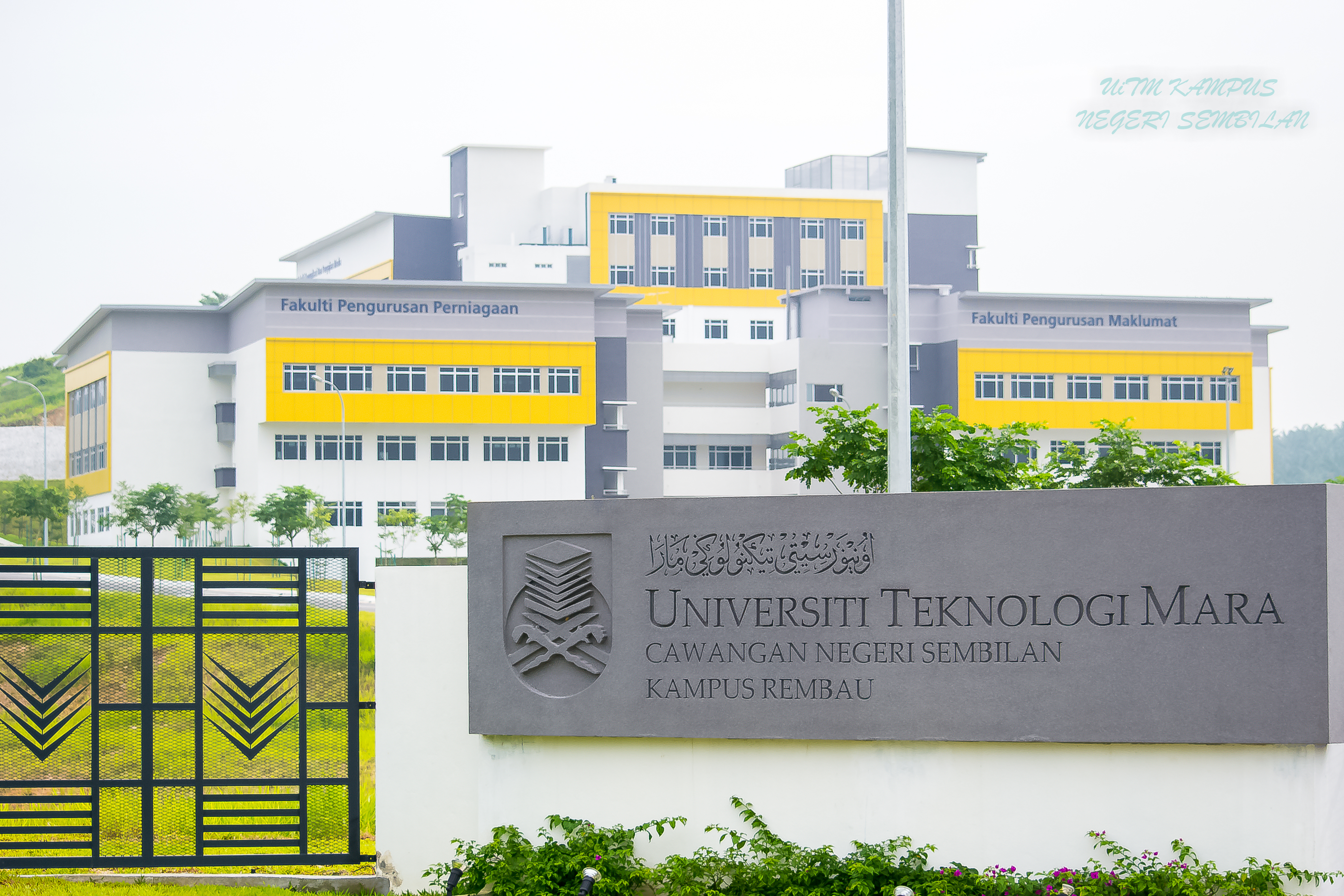
UiTM, Rembau campus

Negeri Sembilan has several tertiary education institutions. Most of these education institutions are concentrated in major towns in Negeri Sembilan. The list below represents public and private university based in Negeri Sembilan:

=== Public universities ===
Name	Acronym	Foundation	Location
Islamic Science University of Malaysia	USIM	1998	Nilai
Universiti Teknologi MARA	UiTM	1999	Kuala Pilah, Seremban & Rembau
Institut Pendidikan Guru Kampus Pendidikan Teknik	IPG KPT	2013	Bandar Enstek, Nilai

=== Private universities and university colleges ===
Name	Acronym	Foundation	Location	Ref
INTI International University	INTI-IU	1998	Nilai	
Manipal International University	MIU	2011	Nilai	
Nilai University	NU	1997	Nilai	
Linton University College	UCL	1995	Mantin	
Malaysia Theological Seminary	STM	1979	Seremban	
UCSI University and International School	UCSI	1986	Bandar Springhill	

== Health care ==
There are public hospitals and private hospitals in Negeri Sembilan:

Public Hospitals

- Hospital Tuanku Jaafar, Seremban
- Hospital Tuanku Ampuan Najihah, Kuala Pilah
- Hospital Port Dickson
- Hospital Tampin
- Hospital Jelebu
- Hospital Jempol
- Hospital Rembau

Private Hospitals

- Nilai Medical Centre
- Seremban Specialist Hospital
- Columbia Asia Medical Centre - Seremban
- Senawang Specialist Hospital
- NSCMH Medical Centre
- Columbia Asia Hospital
- Mawar Medical Centre

== Notable people ==
- Zaquan Adha, professional footballer
- Nabil Ahmad, comedian, actor and television personality
- Zainal Abidin Ahmad, better known by his pen name Za'aba, Malay linguist and writer
- Wan Aishah Wan Ariffin, known mononymously as Aishah, singer, actress, and politician
- Abdul Ghafar Baba, 6th Deputy Prime Minister of Malaysia
- Azam Baki, head of MACC
- Shamsiah Fakeh, feminist and nationalist, one of the prominent figures of Angkatan Wanita Sedar (AWAS).
- Mohamad Hasan, deputy leader of both the United Malays National Organisation and the Barisan Nasional, 10th Menteri Besar of Negeri Sembilan and current Minister of Foreign Affairs
- Shah Indrawan Ismail, also known by his stage name Tomok, singer and actor
- Khairy Jamaluddin, politician and radio personality
- Fish Leong, singer
- Julian Leow Beng Kim, archbishop of the Roman Catholic Archdiocese of Kuala Lumpur
- Anthony Loke, Secretary-General of the Democratic Action Party and current Minister of Transport
- Rosmah Mansor, wife of 6th Prime Minister of Malaysia, Najib Razak
- Abdul Ghani Minhat, former professional footballer
- Tuanku Abdul Rahman ibni Almarhum Tuanku Muhammad, eighth Yamtuan Besar of Negeri Sembilan and the first Yang di-Pertuan Agong of Malaysia
- Siti Nordiana, singer and actress
- Mazlan Othman, astrophysicist
- Tuanku Jaafar ibni Almarhum Tuanku Abdul Rahman, 10th Yamtuan Besar of Negeri Sembilan, as well as the 10th Yang di-Pertuan Agong of Malaysia
- Sinnayah Sabapathy, former track and field athlete
- Dol Said, nationalist and rebel leader, known for his involvement in the Naning War.
- Yong Nyuk Lin, Singaporean politician
- Rais Yatim, 8th Menteri Besar of Negeri Sembilan and 18th president of the Dewan Negara
- Abdul Malek Yusuf, 2nd Yang di-Pertua Negeri of Malacca
- Aidil Zafuan, professional footballer
- Peter van Huizen, professional hockey player

== See also ==
- Overseas Minangkabau
