= Mount Besar Hantu =

Mountain in Negeri Sembilan and Pahang, Malaysia

- Location within Malaysia

Highest point
- Elevation: 1,462 m (4,797 ft)
- Listing: Ribu
- Coordinates: 3°13′37″N 102°00′45″E

Naming
- Native name: Gunung Besar Hantu (Malay)

Geography
- Location: Jelebu District, Negeri Sembilan; Bentong District, Pahang
- Parent range: Titiwangsa Mountains

Climbing
- Easiest route: Hiking via Kenaboi (west) or Janda Baik (east)

Mount Besar Hantu (Malay: Gunung Besar Hantu, Negeri Sembilan Malay: Gunung Bosa Hantu) is a mountain in Kenaboi, Jelebu District, Negeri Sembilan, Malaysia, located near the border with Pahang. It is the tallest peak in Negeri Sembilan as well in southern Peninsular Malaysia, at the height of 1,462 m (4,797 ft).

== Geography ==
Besar Hantu is the highest mountain in the Negri Titiwangsa, the southernmost section of the Titiwangsa Mountains that straddles from the tripoint with the states of Selangor and Pahang down south to the town of Tampin, of which the latter is the geographical southern end of the entire mountain range (see also Mount Tampin).

The mountain is situated within the grounds of Kenaboi State Park.

== Climate ==
Due to its higher altitude relative to other Negri mountains, the summit of Besar Hantu experiences a constant cool highland climate, where it also hosts a mossy forest nearby.

== See also ==
- List of mountains in Malaysia
