= Port Dickson Bypass =

Road in Malaysia

Federal Route 5
- Port Dickson Bypass

Route information
- Maintained by Malaysian Public Works Department
- Existed: 1980–present
- History: Completed in 1982

Major junctions
- North end: Port Dickson (North)
- FT 5 Federal Route 5 FT 53 Federal Route 53
- South end: Port Dickson (South)

Location
- Country: Malaysia
- Primary destinations: Klang, Seremban, Lukut, Teluk Kemang, Malacca

Highway system
- Highways in Malaysia; Expressways; Federal; State

Port Dickson Bypass, Federal Route 5 is a major highway bypass in Port Dickson, Negeri Sembilan, Malaysia

== Junction lists ==
The entire route is located in Port Dickson District, Negeri Sembilan.

Legend:

- I/C - Interchange, I/S - Intersection, RSA - Rest and service area, OBR - Overhead bridge restaurant, R/R - Restaurant and rest plaza, L/B - Layby, V/P - Vista point, TN - tunnel, T/P - Toll plaza, BR - Bridge
- C - Cloverleaf, S - Stack, T-A - Trumpet-A, T-B - Trumpet-B, DT - Directional-T/Y, SDT - Semi-Directional-T/Y, P-Y - Partial-Y, D - Diamond, P-C - Partial cloverleaf, D-D - Diverging diamond, D-R - Direct ramp

Location	km	mi	Exit	Name	Destinations	Notes
Port Dickson			Through to FT 5 Malaysia Federal Route 5 and overlap with FT53			
Port Dickson				Port Dickson (North) I/S	FT 53 Jalan Seremban – Port Dickson town centre, Tuanku Jaafar Power Station	Junctions
Port Dickson				Ayer Meleleh I/S	Jalan Ayer Meleleh – Kampung Dhobi, Tuanku Jaafar Power Station, Kampung Ayer Meleleh	Junctions
Port Dickson				Taman Sri Mawar	Taman Sri Mawar	
Port Dickson				Port Dickson (South) I/S	FT 53 Jalan Dato' Haji Abdul Samad (Jalan Pantai) – Town Centre, PD Waterfront City; Jalan Shell – Shell Oil Refinery	Junctions
Port Dickson			Through to FT 5 Malaysia Federal Route 5			
1.000 mi = 1.609 km; 1.000 km = 0.621 mi: Concurrency terminus
