= Bandar Springhill =

Planned township in Port Dickson District, Negeri Sembilan, Malaysia

Coordinates: 2°35′41.3″N 101°51′32.4″E

- Suburb of Port Dickson
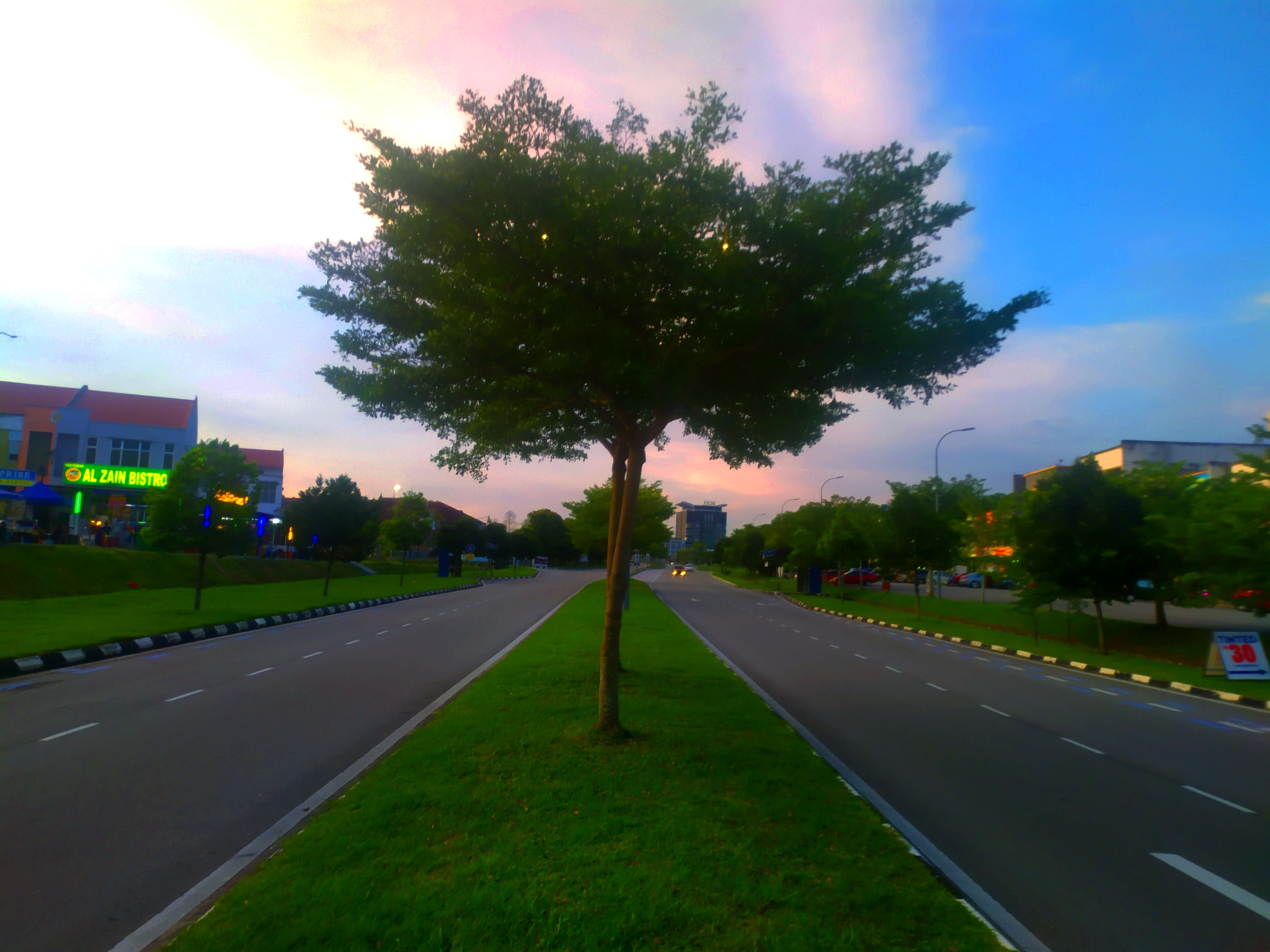
- Persiaran Springhill, the main thoroughfare of the township
- Interactive map of Bandar Springhill
- Country: Malaysia
- State: Negeri Sembilan
- District: Port Dickson
- Luak: Sungai Ujong
- Established: 1997

Government
  - Body: Port Dickson Municipal Council
  - President: Hasnor Abdul Hamid
  - MP: Aminuddin Harun (PH–PKR)
  - MLA: Choo Ken Hwa (PH–DAP)
- Elevation: 25 m (82 ft)
- Time zone: UTC+8 (MST)
  - Summer (DST): Not applicable
- Postcode: 71010
- Website: https://bandarspringhill.com/

Bandar Springhill is a planned township in Port Dickson District, Negeri Sembilan, Malaysia. A suburb of Port Dickson, the township is located near Lukut, and also adjacent to Bandar Sri Sendayan in neighbouring Seremban District.

== Development ==
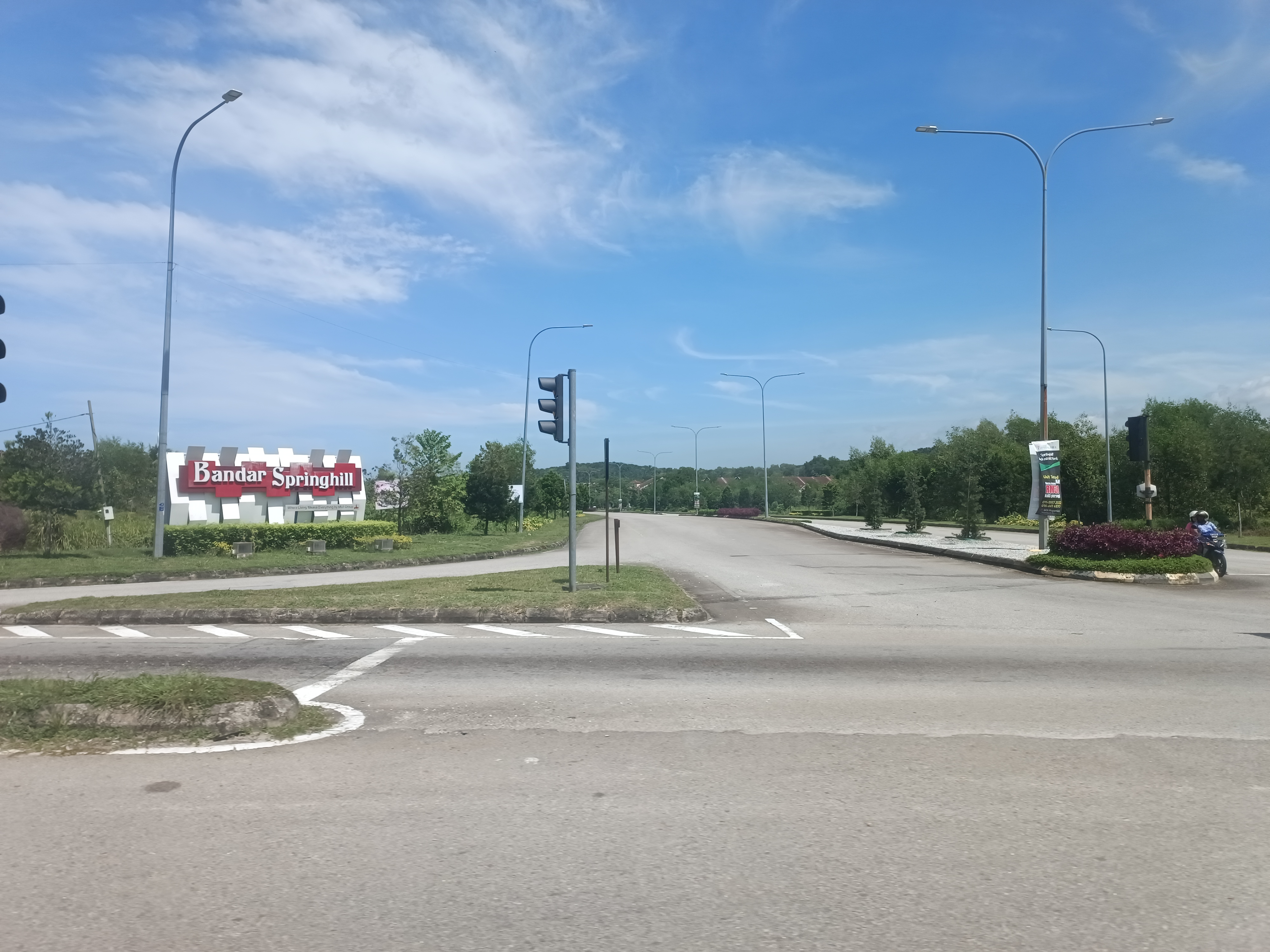
Northern entrance to Bandar Springhill

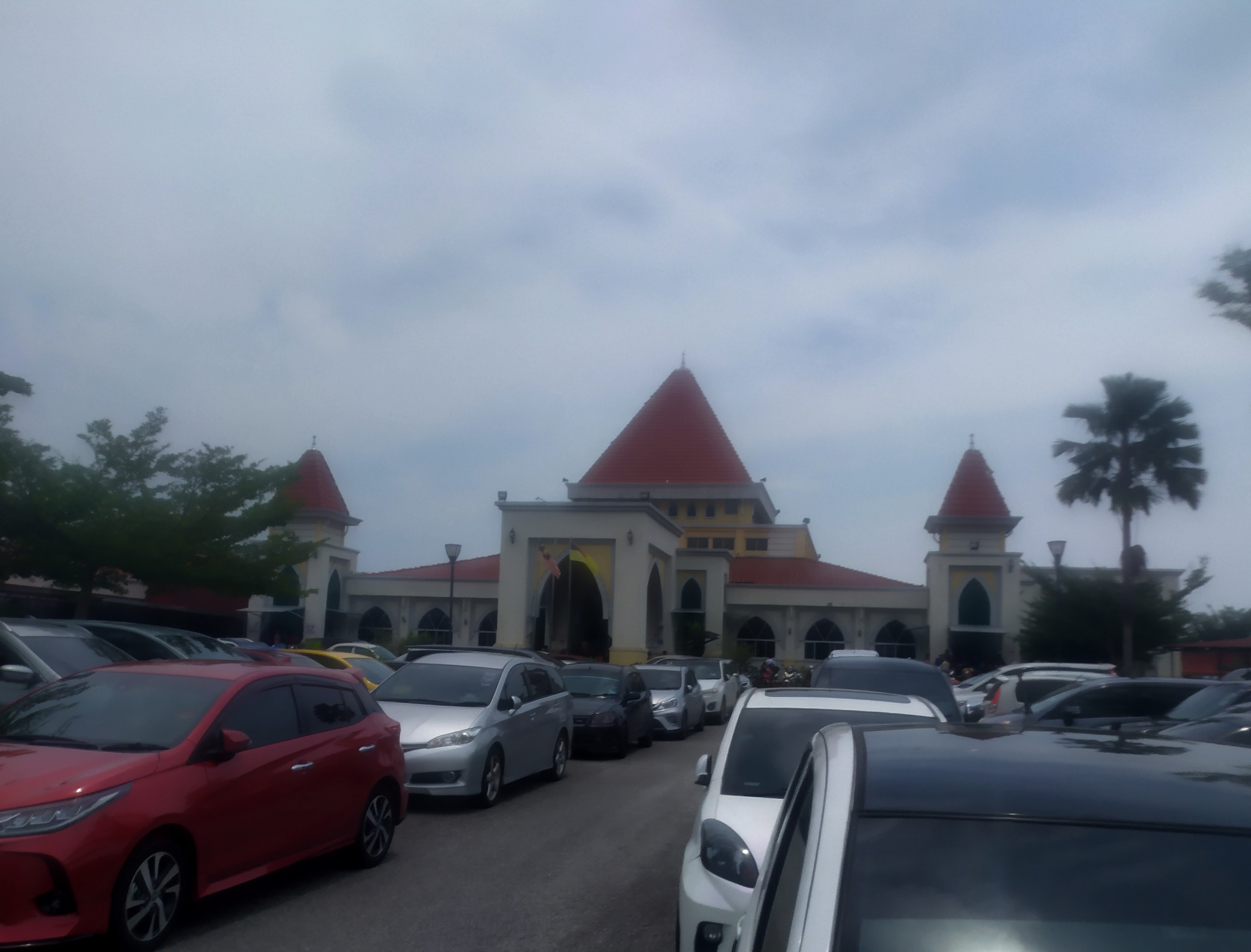
Bandar Springhill Communal Mosque

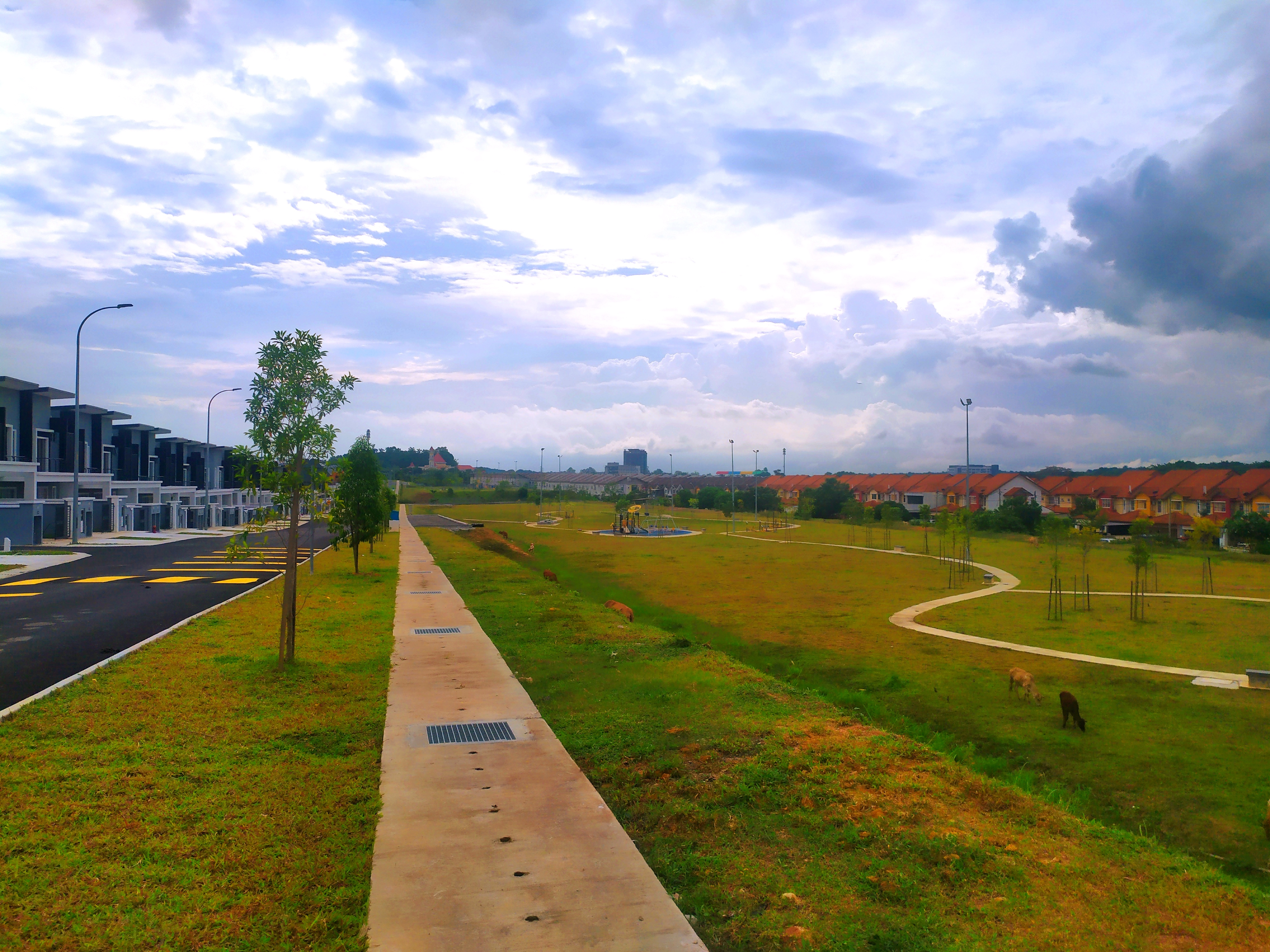
Modern terrace housing at one of Bandar Springhill's phases

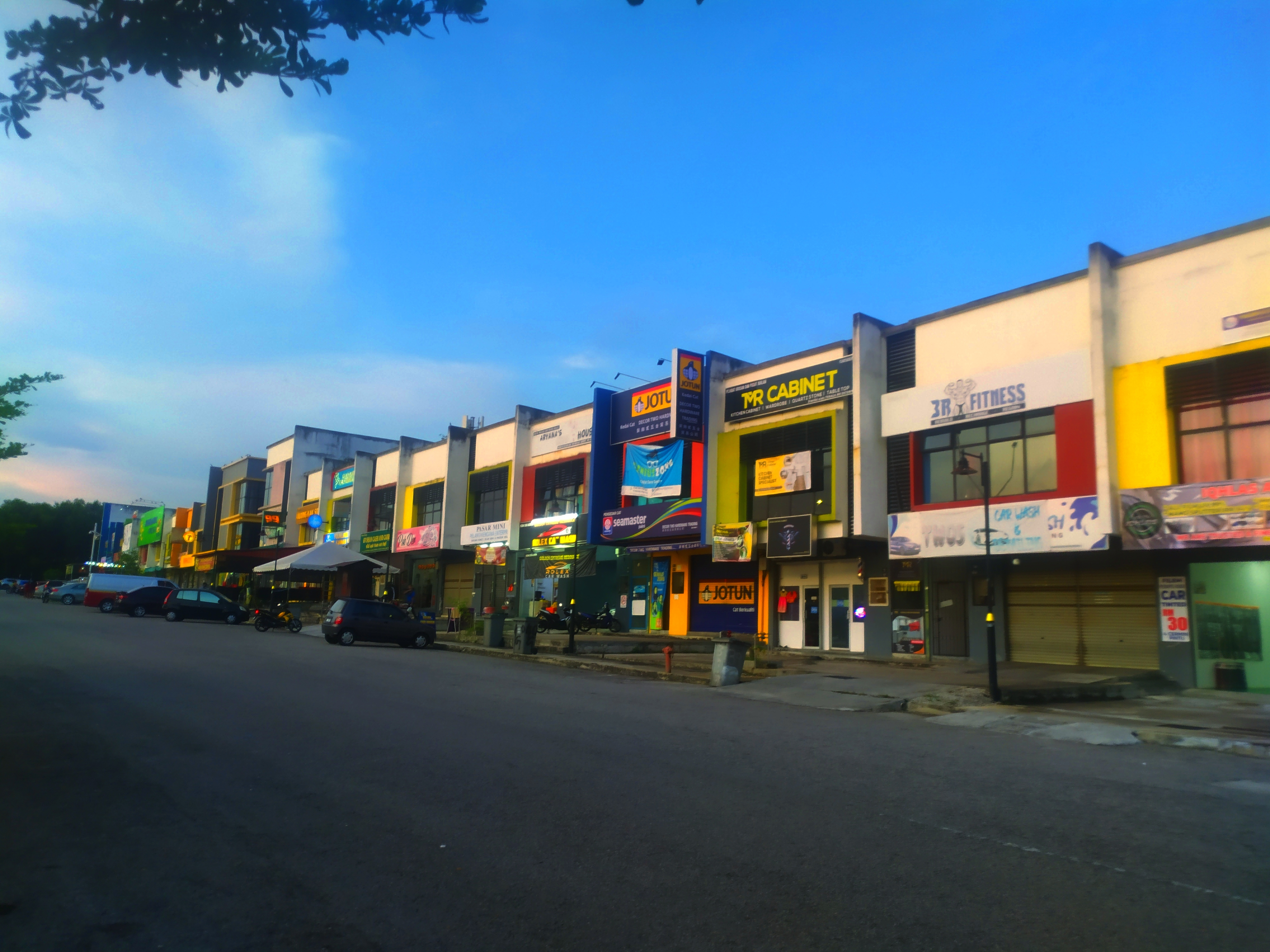
The Junction

Bandar Springhill was first conceived in July 1997. The township is situated within the Malaysia Vision Valley growth corridor that spans both Seremban and Port Dickson districts in western Negeri Sembilan. West Synergy Sdn Bhd, a 60-40 joint-venture between the MUI Group through its property arm, MUI Properties Berhad and Chin Teck Plantations Berhad, planned out to develop the 2,000-acre (8.1 km^{2}) freehold land into the following components:

=== Eastern sector ===
- E1S (future residential development)
- E2
  - 2 Residences
  - Springhill Commercial Centre
- E3A (Amarilis)
- Park Residences
- E4
  - Olive & Maple
  - Ortus Avenue (joint venture with SCLand)
  - Ortus Square (future commercial development, joint venture with SCLand)
- E5 (Nebula)
- E6 (Aurora & Nova)
- E7
  - Residence 7
  - E7-1 (Peony & Freesia)
  - E7-2 (Irises & Cosmos)
- E8 (Cempaka)
- E9
  - Meranti Residences
  - The Junction
- E10
  - 10 North Residences
  - 10 South Residences
  - 10 Avenue Square
  - E10S (future residential development)
- E11 (Springhill Heights)
- E12 (future residential development)
- UCSI International School

=== Western sector ===
- Springhill Industrial Park
  - SIP1
  - SIP2
    - Ortus Park (joint venture with SCLand)
  - SIP3
    - Antmed production facility
  - W1 (future industrial development)
  - W2
  - W3
    - Google's Port Dickson Data Centre Infrastructure Hub (joint venture with Gamuda)
- UCSI Health Metropolis
  - UCSI University and Hospital

== Infrastructures ==
=== Transportation ===
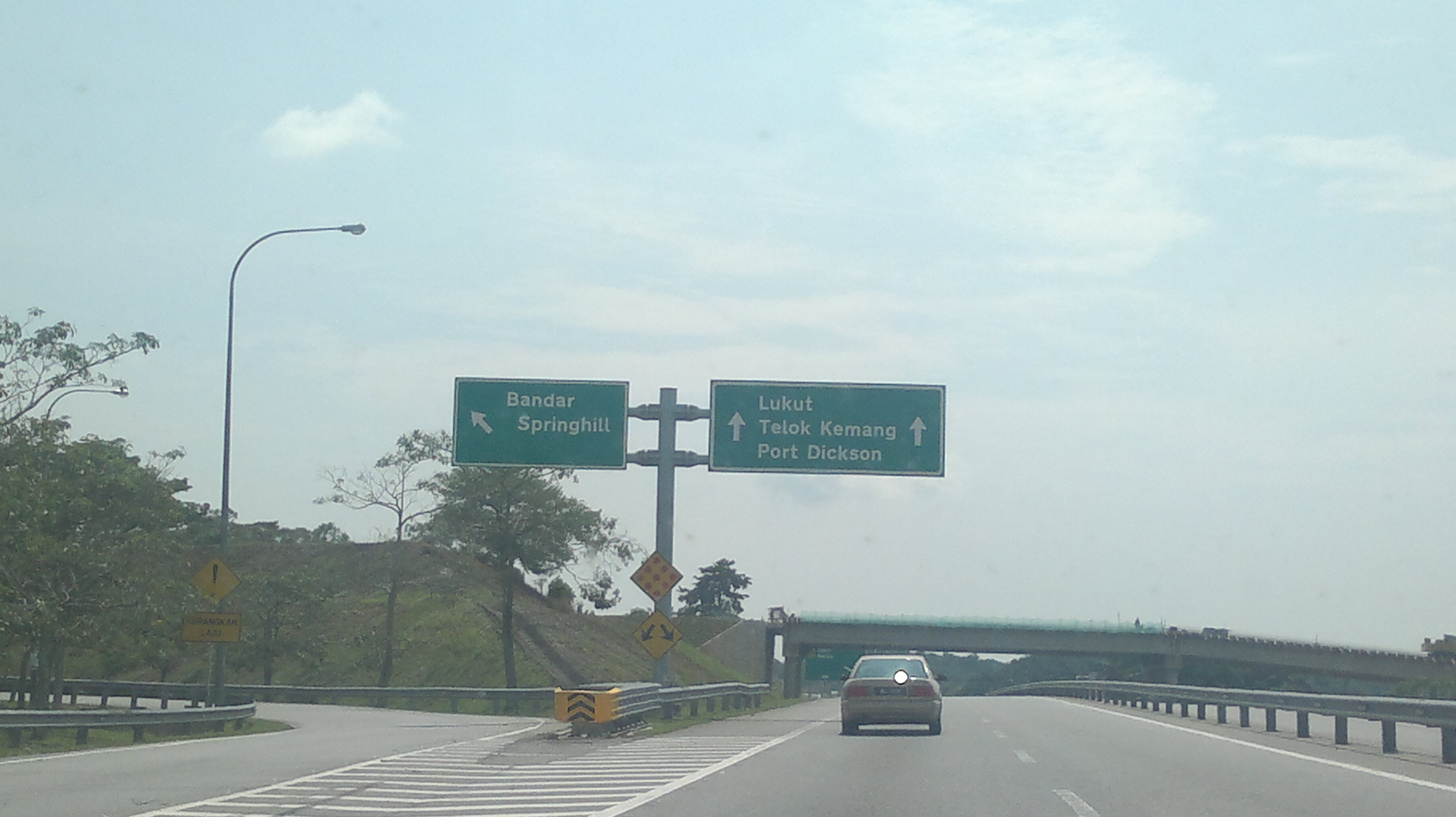
Bandar Springhill interchange (EXIT 2901), SPDH

Bandar Springhill is accessible from both Seremban and Port Dickson via Malaysia Federal Route 53 and the Seremban-Port Dickson Highway.

=== Healthcare ===
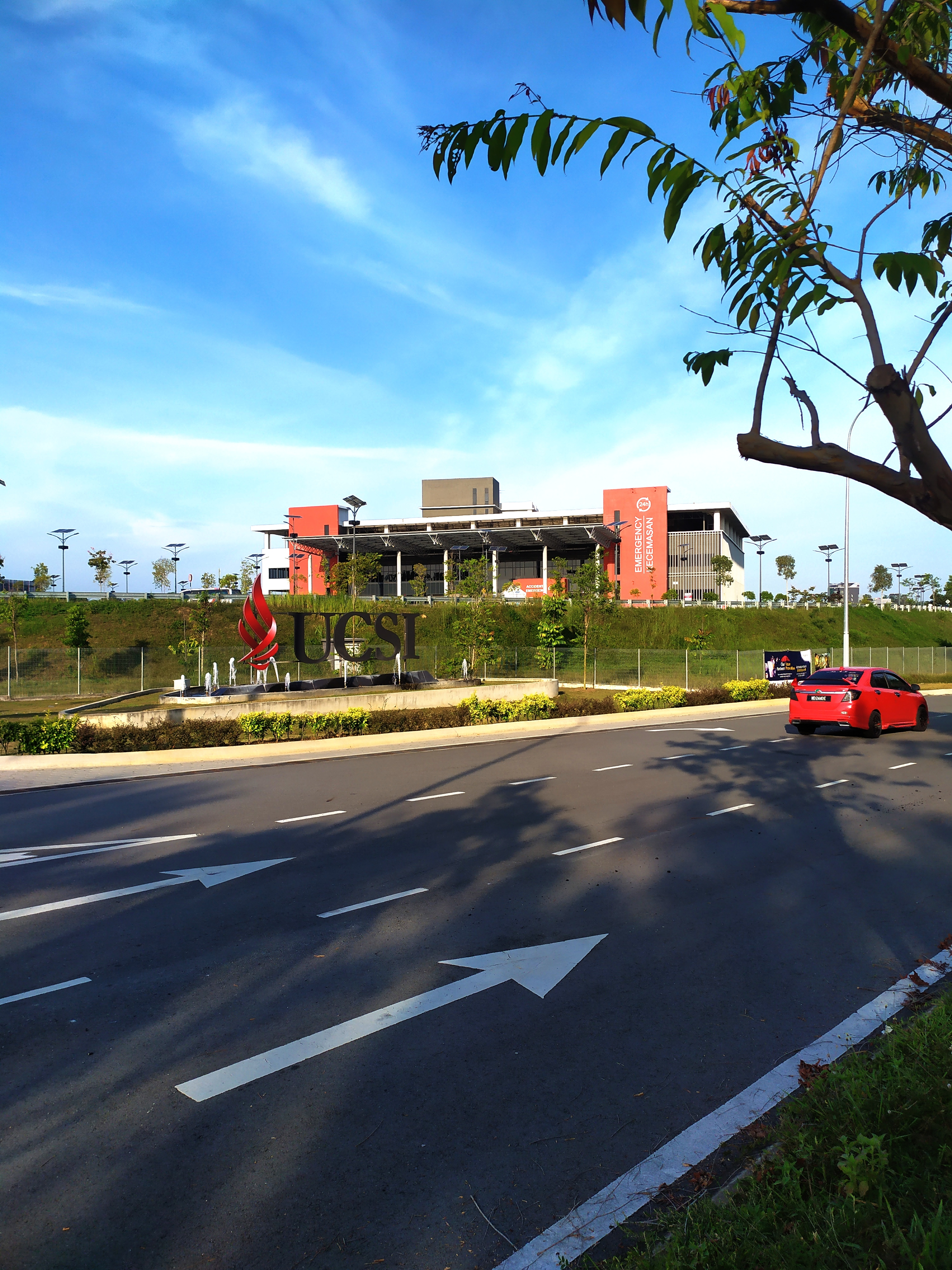
UCSI University and Hospital

In terms of healthcare, Bandar Springhill is served by two polyclinics and the larger UCSI Hospital at the opposite side of the Seremban-Port Dickson Highway, to which it is linked by an overpass.

=== Education ===
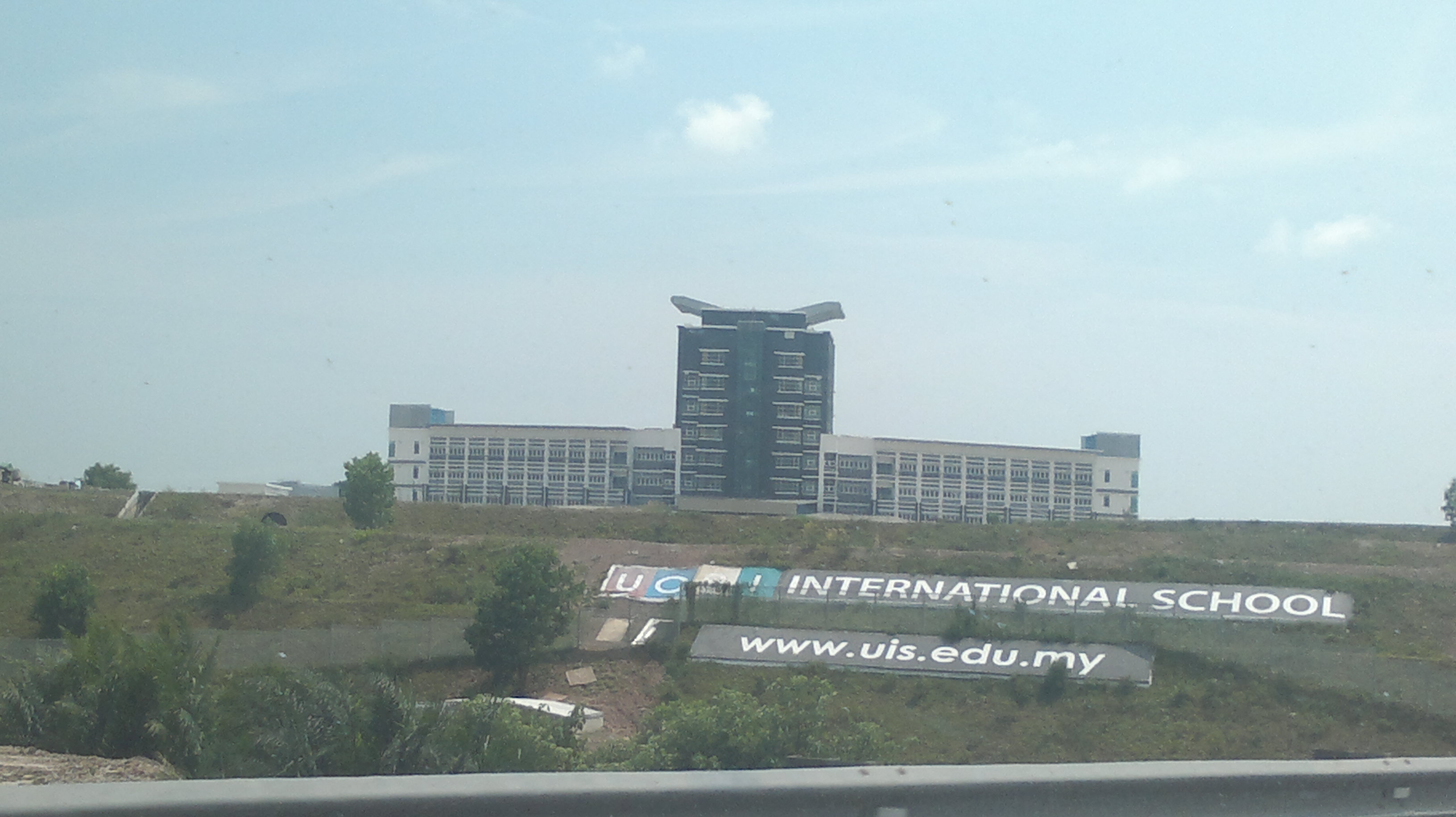
UCSI International School, Bandar Springhill

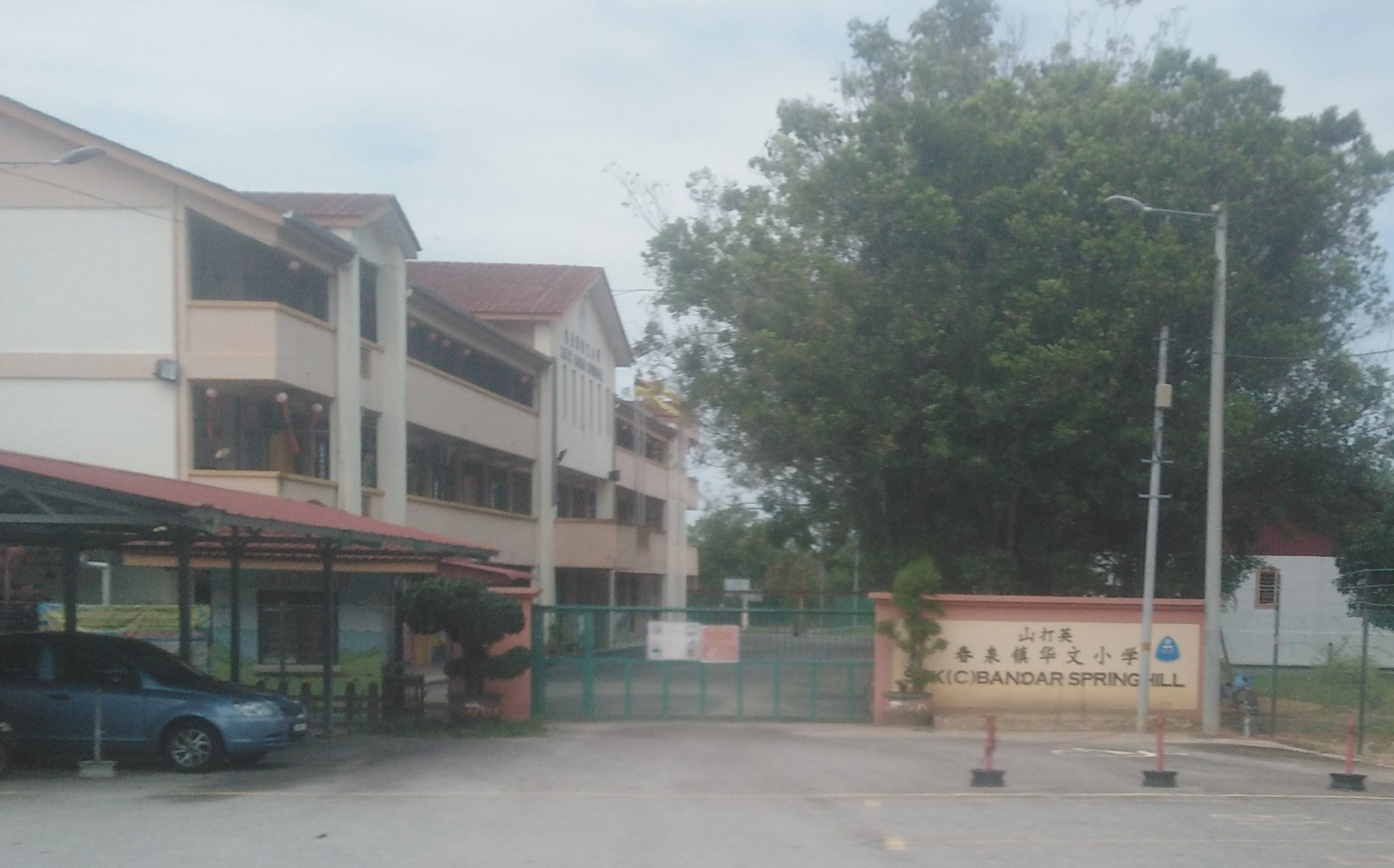
SJK (C) Bandar Springhill

A number of educational institutions, ranging from preschool to tertiary, are also present in Bandar Springhill and its vicinities, such as the UCSI University (also integrated with the hospital), UCSI International School, Sekolah Jenis Kebangsaan (C) Bandar Springhill and Sekolah Jenis Kebangsaan (T) Bandar Springhill, as well as Sekolah Kebangsaan Lukut and Sekolah Menengah Kebangsaan Yam Tuan Radin outside of the township.

=== Other amenities ===
- Petronas petrol station
- A&W outlet
