= Mambau =

- Suburb of Seremban
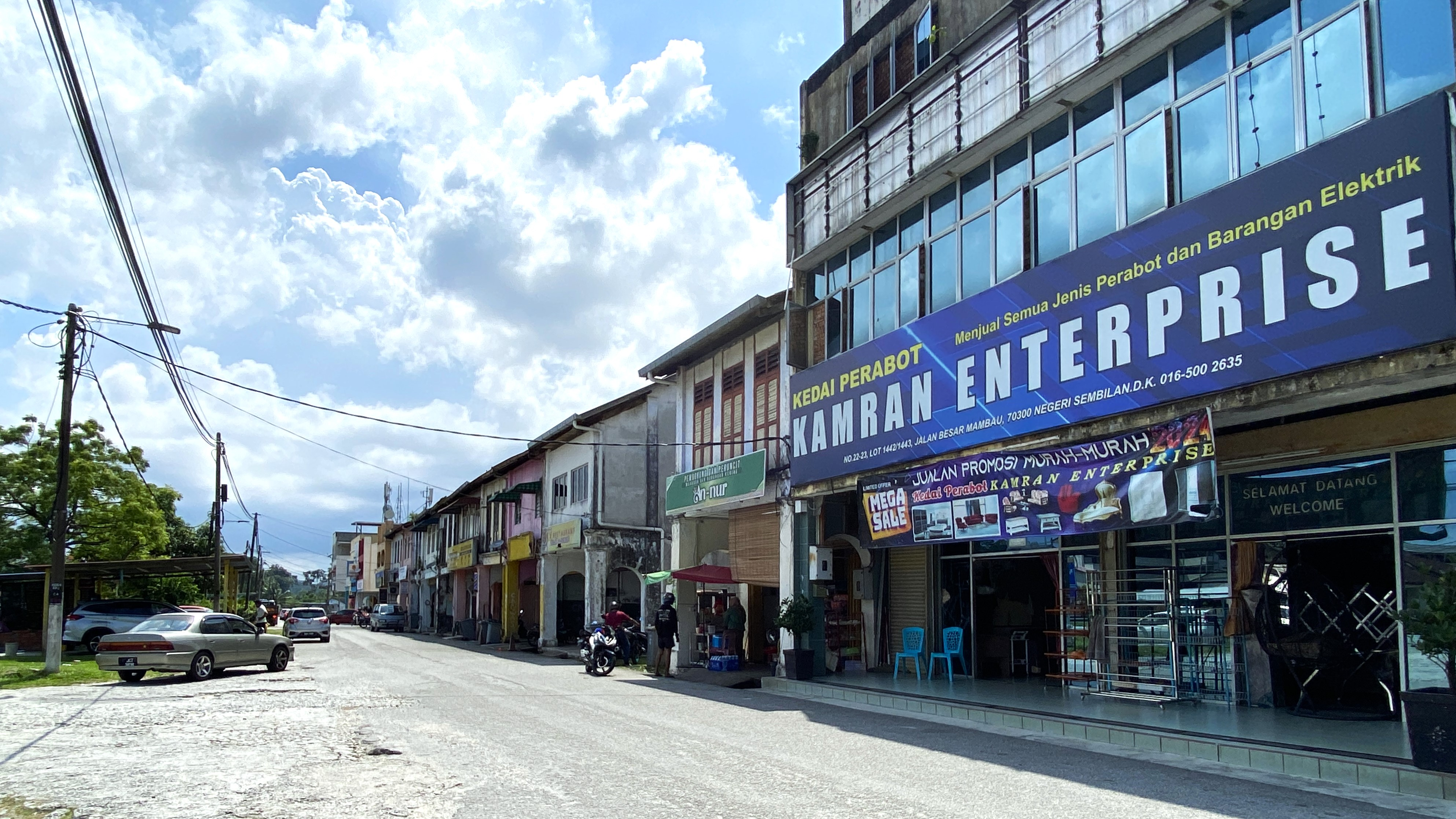
- Prewar shophouses in the old downtown of Mambau.

- Location of Mambau Mambau (Peninsular Malaysia) Mambau (Malaysia)
- Country: Malaysia
- State: Negeri Sembilan
- District: Seremban
- Luak: Sungai Ujong

Government
  - Body: Seremban City Council
  - Mayor: Masri Baharuddin
  - MP: Cha Kee Chin (PH–DAP)
  - MLA: Lee Kai Yet (PH–DAP)
- Time zone: UTC+8 (MYT)
- Postcode: 70300

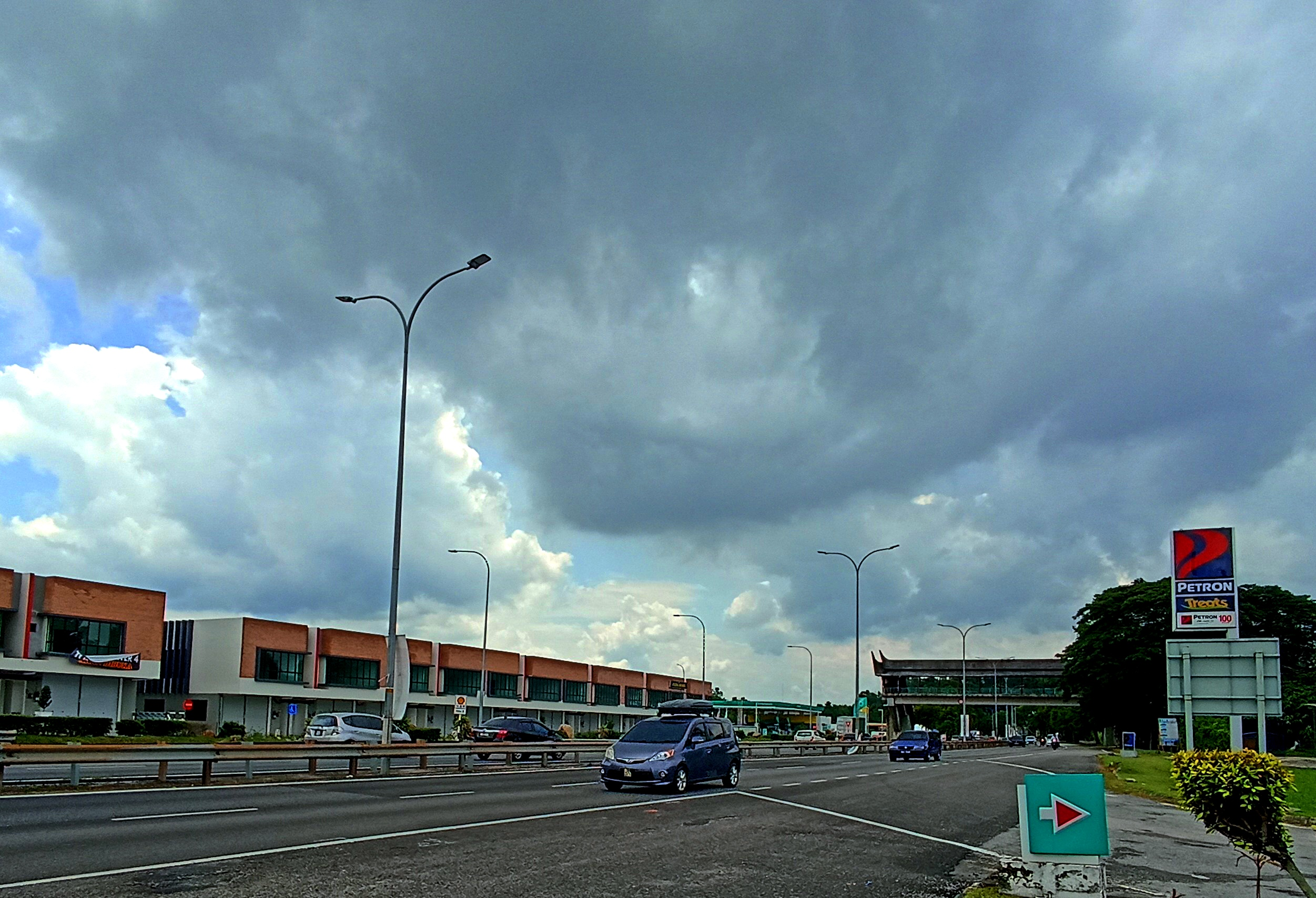
Mambau section of Federal Route 53, bound for Seremban.

Mambau is a suburb in Seremban, Negeri Sembilan, Malaysia. Mambau area includes Mambau old town, Kampung Bemban, Kampung Baru Mambau, Kampung Batu 3, Kampung Mawar, Kampung Kayu Ara, Kampung Mambau, Iringan Bayu, Taman Angsamas, Taman Kelab Tuanku, and Taman Marlin Height.

Mambau is located along Federal Route 53, a trunk road that connects Seremban to the resort town of Port Dickson, located 30 km west of the city. In addition to that, Mambau is also the eastern end of the tolled Seremban-Port Dickson Highway (E29), which serves as an alternative to FT53. Mambau is a transit point of the historical Seremban-Port Dickson railway line, which is one of the earlier railway routes in Malaysia.
