= Malaysia Federal Route 53 =

Road in Malaysia

Federal Route 53
- Jalan Seremban–Port Dickson

Route information
- Maintained by Malaysian Public Works Department
- Length: 33.24 km (20.65 mi)
- Existed: 1887–present
- History: Completed in 1910

Major junctions
- Northeast end: Seremban
- FT 1 Federal Route 1 Seremban Inner Ring Road; North–South Expressway Southern Route / AH2; Seremban–Port Dickson Highway; FT 1265 Federal Route 1265; N7 Jalan Rantau; N6 Jalan Siliau; FT 5 Federal Route 5
- Southwest end: Port Dickson (South)

Location
- Country: Malaysia
- Primary destinations: Rasah Jaya, Mambau, Labu, Nilai, Siliau, Sepang, Kuala Lumpur International Airport (KLIA) , Lukut, Port Dickson

Highway system
- Highways in Malaysia; Expressways; Federal; State

Federal Route 53, or Jalan Seremban–Port Dickson, is a federal road in Negeri Sembilan, Malaysia, connecting Seremban to Port Dickson. The 33.2 km (20.6 mi) Federal Route 53 became the backbone of the road system linking Seremban to Port Dickson before being surpassed by the Seremban–Port Dickson Highway (E29) in 1998.

The Kilometre Zero of the Federal Route 53 is located at Port Dickson, at its interchange with the Federal Route 5, the main trunk road of the west coast of Peninsular Malaysia. The Kilometre Zero monument is erected near Pos Malaysia post office at Jalan Baharu, Port Dickson.

== History ==
By the 1990s to 2000s, the road was bogged down with severe congestion, and the present Seremban–Port Dickson Highway was built to replace it.

== Features ==
Dangerous corners along the route.

At most sections, the Federal Route 53 was built under the JKR R5 road standard, with a speed limit of 90 km/h.

There is one overlap: Port Dickson–Lukut (overlaps with Federal Route 5).

== Junction and town lists ==
The entire route is located in Negeri Sembilan.

Legend:

- I/C - Interchange, I/S - Intersection, RSA - Rest and service area, OBR - Overhead bridge restaurant, R/R - Restaurant and rest plaza, L/B - Layby, V/P - Vista point, TN - tunnel, T/P - Toll plaza, BR - Bridge
- C - Cloverleaf, S - Stack, T-A - Trumpet-A, T-B - Trumpet-B, DT - Directional-T/Y, SDT - Semi-Directional-T/Y, P-Y - Partial-Y, D - Diamond, P-C - Partial cloverleaf, D-D - Diverging diamond, D-R - Direct ramp

| District | Location | km | mi | Name | Destinations | Notes |
|---|---|---|---|---|---|---|
| Seremban | Seremban | | | Seremban | FT 1 Jalan Za'aba – Senawang, Rembau | T-junctions |
| Seremban | Seremban | | | Seremban | FT 1 Jalan Tuanku Antah – Mantin, Kajang, Kuala Lumpur | Ramp off |
| Seremban | Seremban | | | Railway crossing bridge | | |
| Seremban | Seremban | | | Jalan Bukit Tembok | Jalan Bukit Tembok | T-junctions |
| Seremban | Seremban | | | Bukit Rasah | Bukit Rasah | T-junctions |
| Seremban | Seremban | | | Tuanku Ja'afar Hospital | Taman Lian,Tuanku Ja'afar Hospital | Interchange |
| Seremban | Seremban | | | Jalan Rasah-SIRR; Railway crossing bridge | Seremban Inner Ring Road – Labu, Nilai, Mantin, Senawang, Kuala Pilah, Kuala Klawang | Stacked elevated cloverleaf interchangewith railway crossing bridge |
| Seremban | Seremban | | | Sungai Linggi bridge | | |
| Seremban | Seremban | | | Port Dickson South-NSE | North–South Expressway Southern Route / AH2 – Senawang, Malacca, Johor Bahru | T-junctions |
| Seremban | Seremban | | | Jalan Tok Ungku | Jalan Tok Ungku – Rasah Jaya | T-junctions |
| Seremban | Seremban | | | NSE crossing bridge Maximum height limit: 4.4 m | | |
| Seremban | Seremban | | | Port Dickson North-NSE | North–South Expressway Southern Route / AH2 – Kuala Lumpur, Kuala Lumpur International Airport (KLIA), Nilai | T-junctions |
| Seremban | Seremban | | | Jalan Rasah Jaya Utama 4 | Jalan Rasah Jaya Utama 4 – Rasah Jaya | T-junctions |
| Seremban | Mambau | | | Sungai Anak Air Gembala bridge | | |
| Seremban | Mambau | | | Mambau-SPDH | Seremban–Port Dickson Highway – Port Dickson, Teluk Kemang | Trumpet interchange |
| Seremban | Mambau | | | Mambau | N7 Jalan Rantau – Rantau | Roundabout |
| Seremban | Mambau | | | Sungai Linggi bridge | | |
| Seremban | Mambau | | | Railway crossing | | |
| Seremban | Mambau | | | Jalan Labu | FT 1265 Jalan Labu – Labu, Nilai, Kuala Lumpur International Airport (KLIA), Sepang International Circuit | T-junctions |
| Port Dickson | Lukut | | | Jalan Siliau | N6 Jalan Siliau – Siliau, Rantau | T-junctions |
| Port Dickson | Lukut | | | Bandar Springhill | Bandar Springhill | T-junctions |
| Port Dickson | Lukut | | | Lukut East-SPDH | Seremban–Port Dickson Highway – Teluk Kemang, Malacca | T-junctions |
| Port Dickson | Lukut | | | Lukut West-SPDH | Seremban–Port Dickson Highway – Seremban, Kuala Lumpur, Johor Bahru | T-junctions |
| Port Dickson | Lukut | | | Lukut | FT 5 Malaysia Federal Route 5 – Klang, Banting, Sepang, Kuala Lumpur International Airport (KLIA), Sepang International Circuit | T-junctions |
| Port Dickson | Lukut | | | Lukut–Port Dickson Bypass | see also FT 5 Malaysia Federal Route 5 | |
| Port Dickson | Port Dickson | | | Port Dickson (North) | FT 5 Port Dickson Bypass – Malacca, Teluk Kemang | Junctions |
| Port Dickson | Port Dickson | | | Taman PD Mewah | | |
| Port Dickson | Port Dickson | | | Port Dickson Seafood Restaurant | | |
| Port Dickson | Port Dickson | | | Shell Terminal | | |
| Port Dickson | Port Dickson | | | Kampung Gelam | | |
| Port Dickson | Port Dickson | | | Jalan Ayer Meleleh | Jalan Ayer Meleleh – Kampung Dhobi | T-junctions |
| Port Dickson | Port Dickson | | | Tuanku Jaafar Power Station | | |
| Port Dickson | Port Dickson | | | Resort | | |
| Port Dickson | Port Dickson | | | Port Dickson | Jalan Lama – Town Centre, Majlis Perbandaran Port Dickson (MPPD) main headquarters | T-junctions |
| Port Dickson | Port Dickson | | | Railway crossing | | |
| Port Dickson | Port Dickson | 0.0 | 0.0 | Port Dickson | Jalan Baharu – Town Centre, PD Waterfront City, Port Dickson Pos Malaysia post office | Roundabout |
| Port Dickson | Port Dickson | | | Port Dickson; PD Waterfront City | PD Waterfront City | T-junctions |
| Port Dickson | Port Dickson | | | Masjid Jamek Port Dickson | | |
| Port Dickson | Port Dickson | | | Port Dickson District and Land Office | | |
| Port Dickson | Port Dickson | | | Port Dickson; Port Dickson (South) | FT 5 Port Dickson Bypass – Klang, Seremban, Lukut, Malacca, Teluk Kemang, Recreational Beaches; Jalan Shell – Shell Oil Refinery | Junctions |
1.000 mi = 1.609 km; 1.000 km = 0.621 mi: Concurrency terminus
