= Seremban–Port Dickson Highway =

Road in Malaysia

Expressway 29
- Seremban–Port Dickson Highway; Lebuhraya Seremban–Port Dickson 芙蓉–波德申大道

Route information
- Maintained by PLUS Malaysia Berhad with its subsidiary Projek Lebuhraya Usahasama Berhad (Former concessionaries known as Seremban–Port Dickson Highway (SPDH) Sdn Bhd)
- Length: 23 km (14 mi)
- Existed: 1994–present
- History: Completed in 1998

Major junctions
- East end: Mambau on Seremban
- FT 53 Federal Route 53; FT 219 Sua Betong–Sunggala Highway
- West end: Sua Betong on Port Dickson

Location
- Country: Malaysia
- Primary destinations: Seremban, Lukut, Port Dickson, Teluk Kemang, Tanjung Tuan

Highway system
- Highways in Malaysia; Expressways; Federal; State

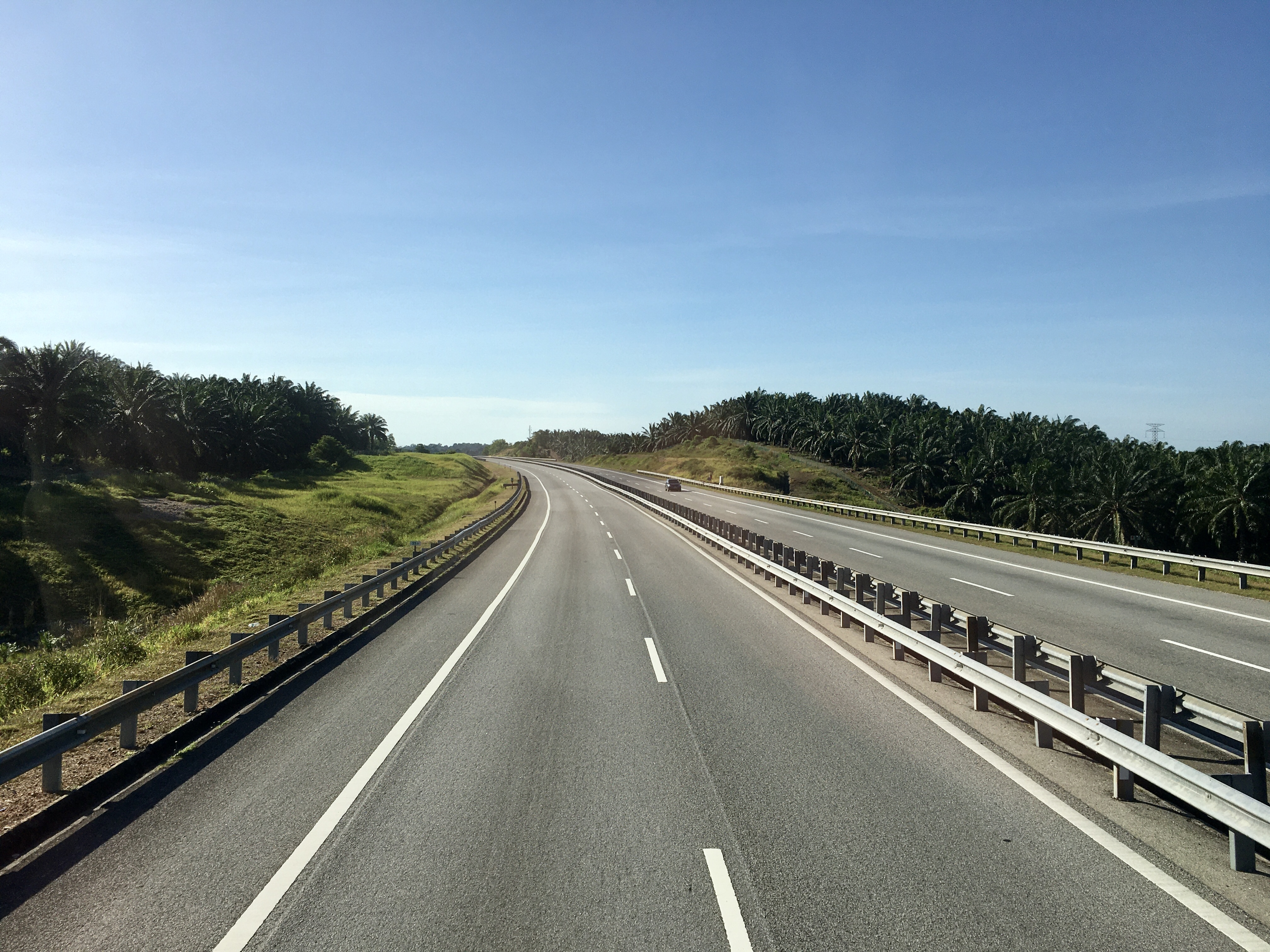
Westbound, towards Teluk Kemang

The Seremban–Port Dickson Highway (SPDH; Malay: Lebuhraya Seremban–Port Dickson) is an expressway in Negeri Sembilan, Malaysia. It was built to shorten the travelling distance from Seremban to Port Dickson and acts as an alternative route for Federal Route 53, which features dangerous corners along the route. The 23 km (14 mi) long expressway was opened to traffic in 1998 and the first concessionaries were Seremban–Port Dickson Highway (SPDH) Sdn Bhd (a member of Melewar Corporation Berhad). Today the expressway is a part of PLUS Expressways network.

== Route background ==
The expressway shares its Kilometre Zero with the old Seremban–Port Dickson Road FT53; hence, the expressway begins at KM7 of Mambau Interchange near Seremban.

== Toll systems ==
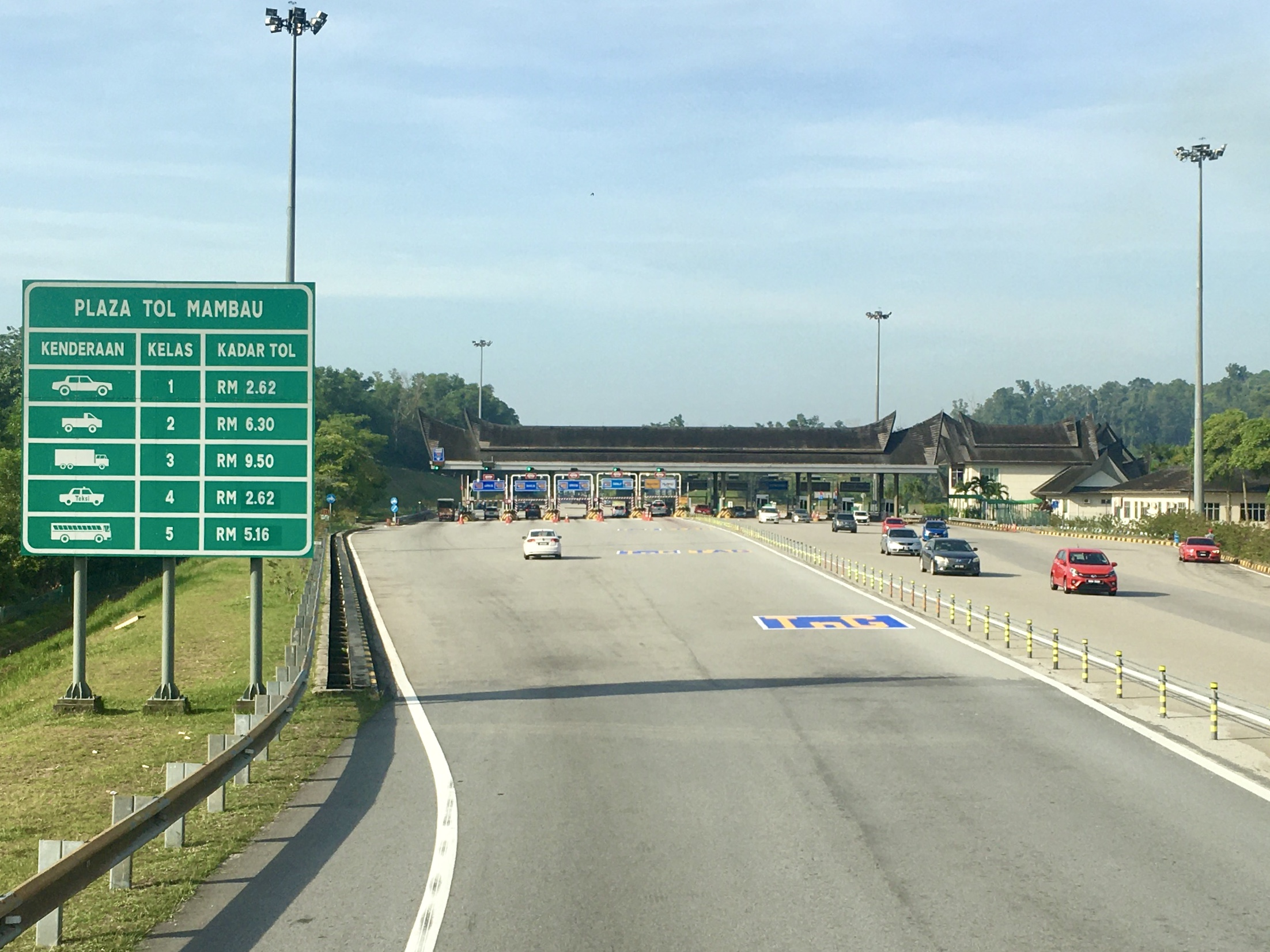
Mambau Toll Plaza, at the eastern end of the SPDH

The Seremban–Port Dickson Highway (SPDH) implements an opened toll system. Tolls only have to be paid when entering the expressway, except when travelling to Seremban, where tolls will be collected at the Mambau Toll Plaza.

=== Electronic Toll Collections ===
As part of an initiative to facilitate faster dissipation of traffic at both Mambau and Lukut Toll Plazas, all toll transactions will be conducted electronically via PLUSMiles cards, Touch 'n Go cards or SmartTAGs starting 1 June 2015. Later, RFID, Malaysia's own radio-frequency identification was introduced in the toll plazas.

=== Toll fares ===
(Since 1 February 2020)

Class	Types of vehicles	Rate (in Malaysian Ringgit (RM))	
Class	Types of vehicles	Mambau	Lukut
0	Motorcycles (Vehicles with two axles and two wheels)	Free	
1	Private Cars (Vehicles with two axles and three or four wheels (excluding taxi and bus))	2.62	0.65
2	Vans and other small good vehicles (Vehicles with two axles and six wheels (excluding bus))	6.30	1.40
3	Large Trucks (Vehicles with three or more axles (excluding bus))	9.50	2.00
4	Taxis	2.62	0.65
5	Buses	5.16	1.14

== Interchanges and rest and service area lists ==
The entire route is located in Negeri Sembilan.

Legend:

- I/C - Interchange, I/S - Intersection, RSA - Rest and service area, OBR - Overhead bridge restaurant, R/R - Restaurant and rest plaza, L/B - Layby, V/P - Vista point, TN - tunnel, T/P - Toll plaza, BR - Bridge
- C - Cloverleaf, S - Stack, T-A - Trumpet-A, T-B - Trumpet-B, DT - Directional-T/Y, SDT - Semi-Directional-T/Y, P-Y - Partial-Y, D - Diamond, P-C - Partial cloverleaf, D-D - Diverging diamond, D-R - Direct ramp

District	Location	km	mi	Exit	Name	Destinations	Notes
Seremban	Mambau	5.0	3.1	Through to FT 53 Jalan Rasah			
Seremban	Mambau				Mambau I/C	FT 53 Malaysia Federal Route 53 – Mambau, Nilai	Trumpet interchange
Seremban	Mambau	6.0	3.7	PLUS Expressways/PROPEL section maintenance office (both bound)			
Seremban	Mambau			Mambau Toll Plaza			
Seremban	Mambau			Sungai Linggi bridge			
Seremban	Mambau			Railway crossing bridge			
Seremban	Mambau			Sungai Bemban bridge			
Seremban	Mambau			Mambau RSA (both bound, separated)			
Port Dickson	Bandar Springhill			Sungai Putting bridge			
Port Dickson	Bandar Springhill			2901	Bandar Springhill I/C	Bandar Springhill	Off ramp Future trumpet interchange
Port Dickson	Lukut			2902	Lukut I/C	FT 53 Malaysia Federal Route 53 – Bandar Springhill, Lukut, Port Dickson, Sepang, Kuala Lumpur International Airport (KLIA)	Half-clover interchange
Port Dickson	Sua Betong			Railway crossing bridge			
Port Dickson	Sua Betong			2903	Sua Betong I/S	FT 219 Sua Betong–Sunggala Highway – Teluk Kemang, Pasir Panjang; N8 Jalan Sungai Menyala – Sua Betong, Ayer Kuning, Rantau, Port Dickson Army Base	Junctions
1.000 mi = 1.609 km; 1.000 km = 0.621 mi: Concurrency terminus; Incomplete access

== See also ==
- North–South Expressway
- Malaysia Federal Route 53
