= Tanjung Gemuk =

Coastal village and beach in Pahang, Malaysia

- Coastal Village
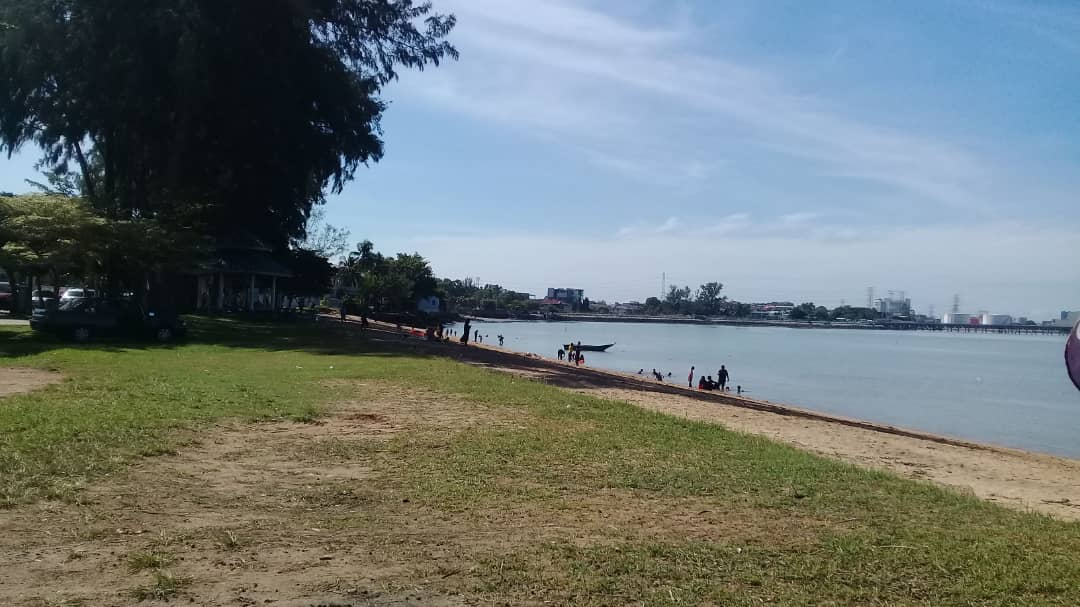
- Tanjung Gemuk beach
- Interactive map of Tanjung Gemuk
- Coordinates: 2.5456117°N 101.7986962°E
- Country: Malaysia
- State: Pahang
- District: Rompin District
- Time zone: UTC+8 (MST)

Tanjung Gemuk (literally "Fat Cape") is a small coastal village and beach near Endau in the Malaysian state of Pahang. Its beach is a part of Port Dickson's long coastline facing the Strait of Malacca.

== Tourism and Development ==
The area has undergone substantial tourist development with hotels ranging from budget friendly like the Glory Beach Resort to upmarket hotels like the Grand Lexis Port Dickson with water chalets. In addition to hotels, Tanjung Gemuk has a residential area with local coffee shops and groceries used by both general population and tourists.

== Natural Phenomena ==
Tanjung Gemuk has recently become a site for two notable natural occurrences. The beach at Tanjung Gemuk is a known turtle nesting ground, and a turtle hatchery has been established at Glory Beach Resort for conservation efforts. Following the 2004 Indian Ocean earthquake and tsunami, a large number of sea cucumbers were washed ashore on the beach.
