= Tuanku Jaafar Power Station =

Tuanku Jaafar
- Country: Malaysia
- Location: Port Dickson, Negeri Sembilan,
- Coordinates: 2.533°N 101.7912°E
- Construction began: 2004
- Commission date: 2005
- Owner: Tenaga Nasional
- Operator: Tenaga Nasional
- Combined cycle?: Yes

Power generation
- Nameplate capacity: 1,411 MW

Tuanku Jaafar Power Station is one of the main power stations in Malaysia, located in Port Dickson, Negeri Sembilan. The power station belongs to Tenaga Nasional Berhad and is a state-of-art combined cycle power plants comprise PD1 (750MW MHI Technology) and PD2 (750MW GE-TOSHIBA Technology).

PD1 was on commercial loading in 2005 whereas PD2 started in February 2009. Both combined cycle plants are firing natural gas supplied by Petronas with distillate as a stand-by fuel.

The first phase of Tuanku Jaafar Power Station began in 1969, when it was a conventional thermal power plant (firing fuel-oil) 4 x 60MW units. This was followed in 1978 with 3 x 120MW units. A 25MW Gas Turbine was added for blackstart and peaking purposes.

In 2000, the conventional power plant was dismantled in stages to allow for rehabilitation project, which was fully completed in 2009. Tuanku Jaafar Power Station has now become the power plant of choice (top in the merit order) with high efficiency, full automation (Automatic Governor Control-AGC), in compliance to the international standards and environment.

List of General Managers

Since its commissioning in 1978, SJTJ has been led by the following General Managers:

[Name 1] (1978 – [Year]) [Name 2] ([Year] – [Year]) [Name 3] ([Year] – [Year]) [Name 4] ([Year] – [Year]) [Name 5] ([Year] – Present)

== See also ==
- List of power stations in Malaysia
