= Port Dickson =

Port Dickson Podeksen (Negeri Sembilan Malay) Tanjung Kemuning
- Resort town and district capital
- Port Dickson Town; Bandar Port Dickson
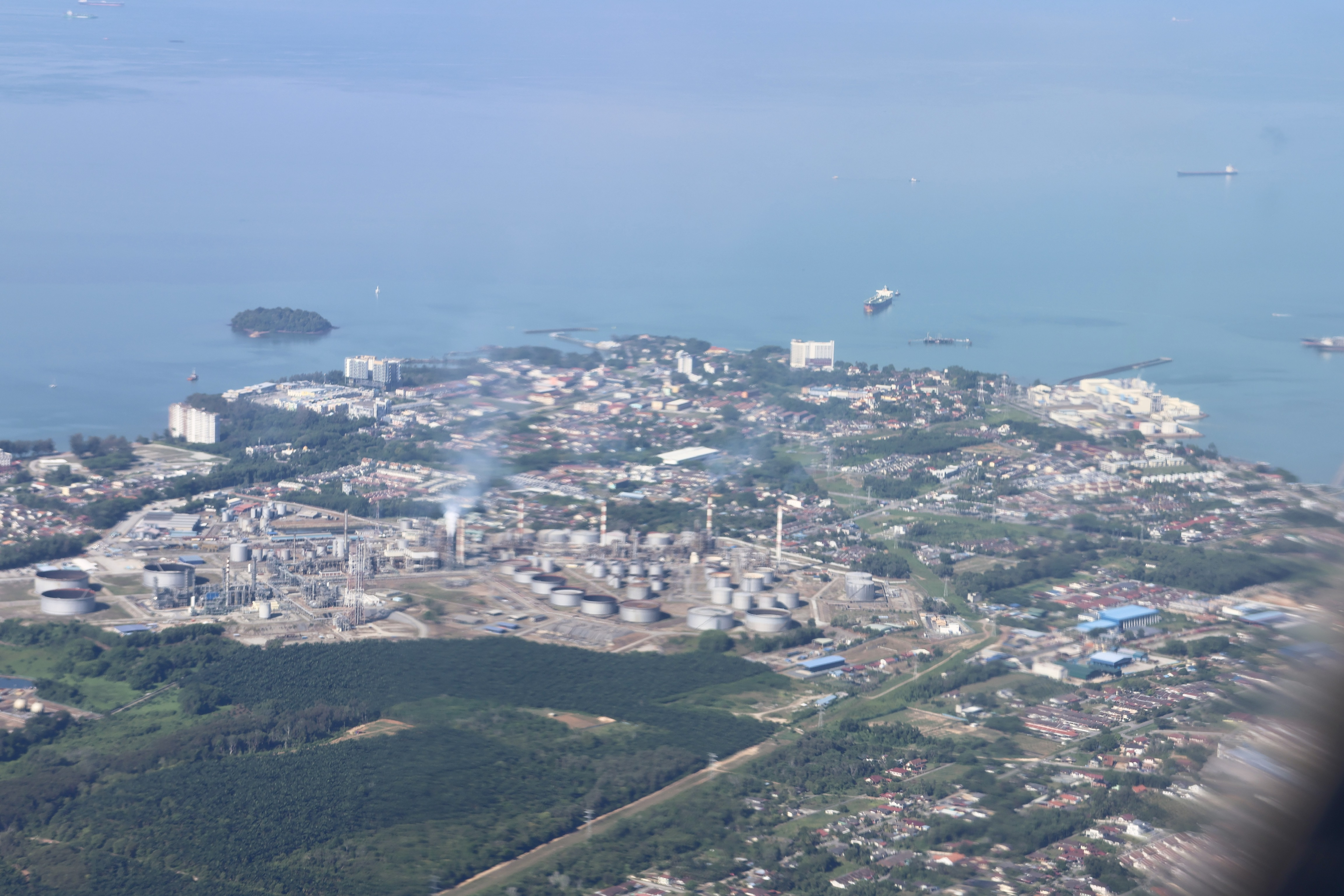
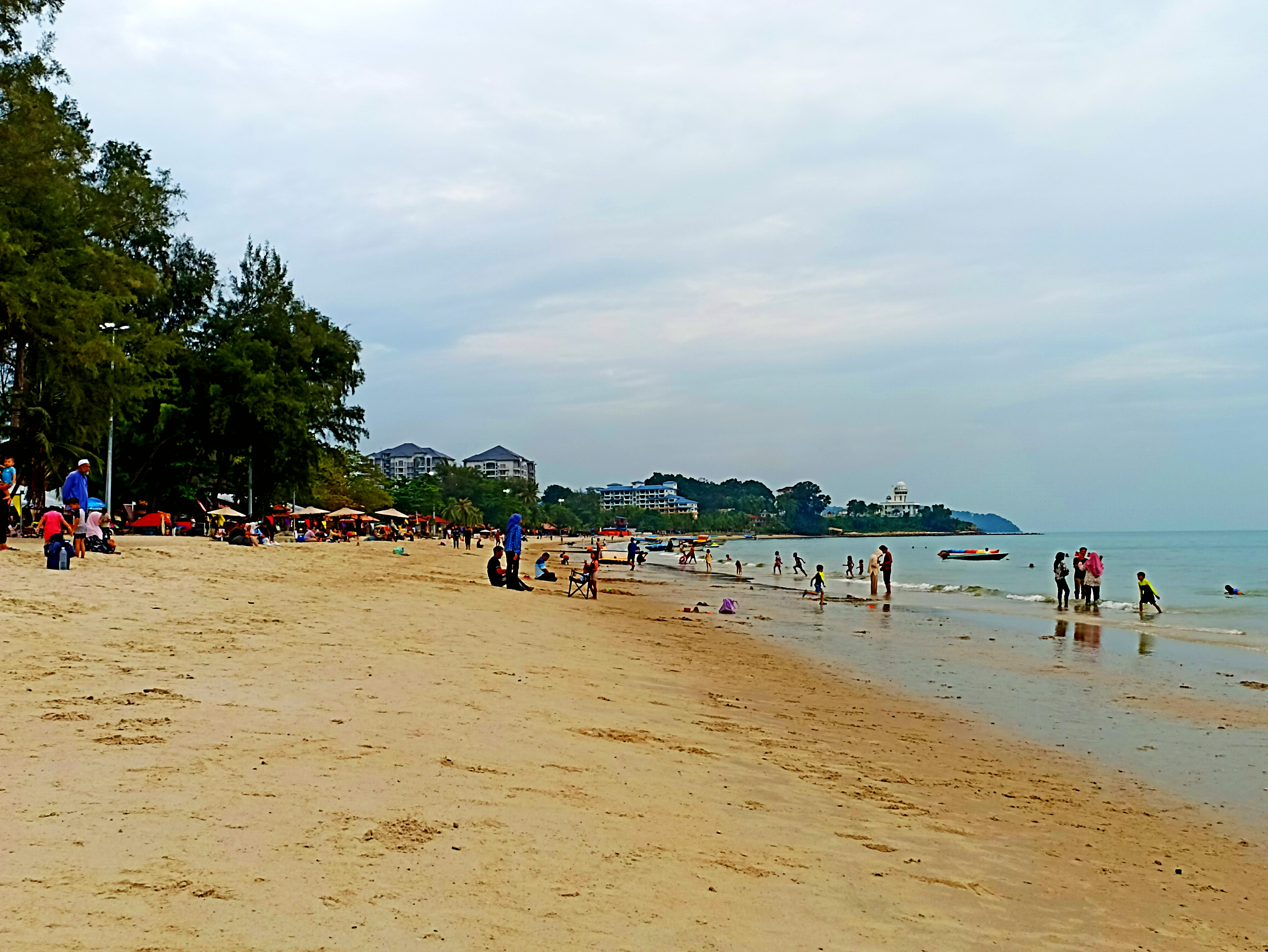
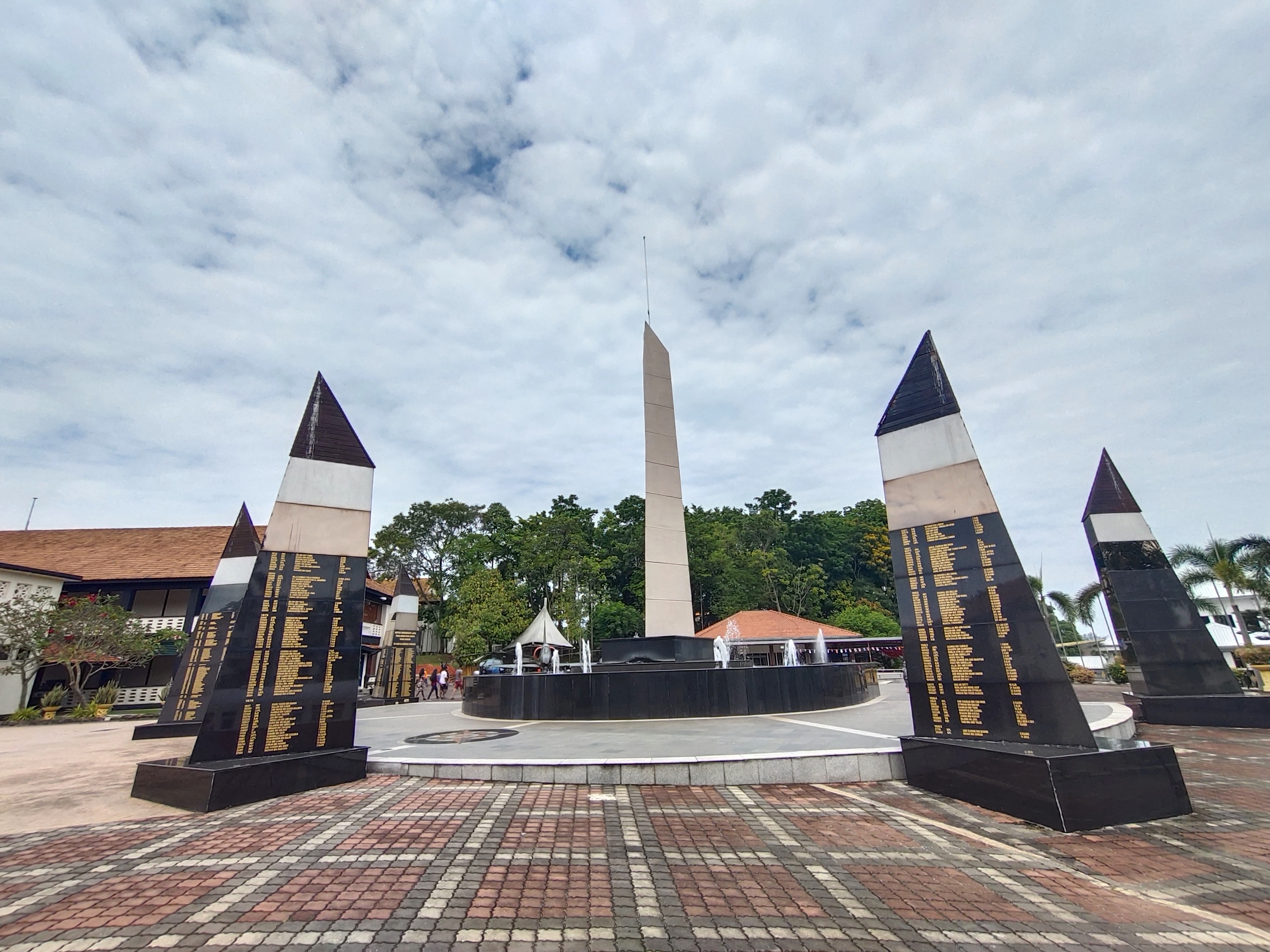
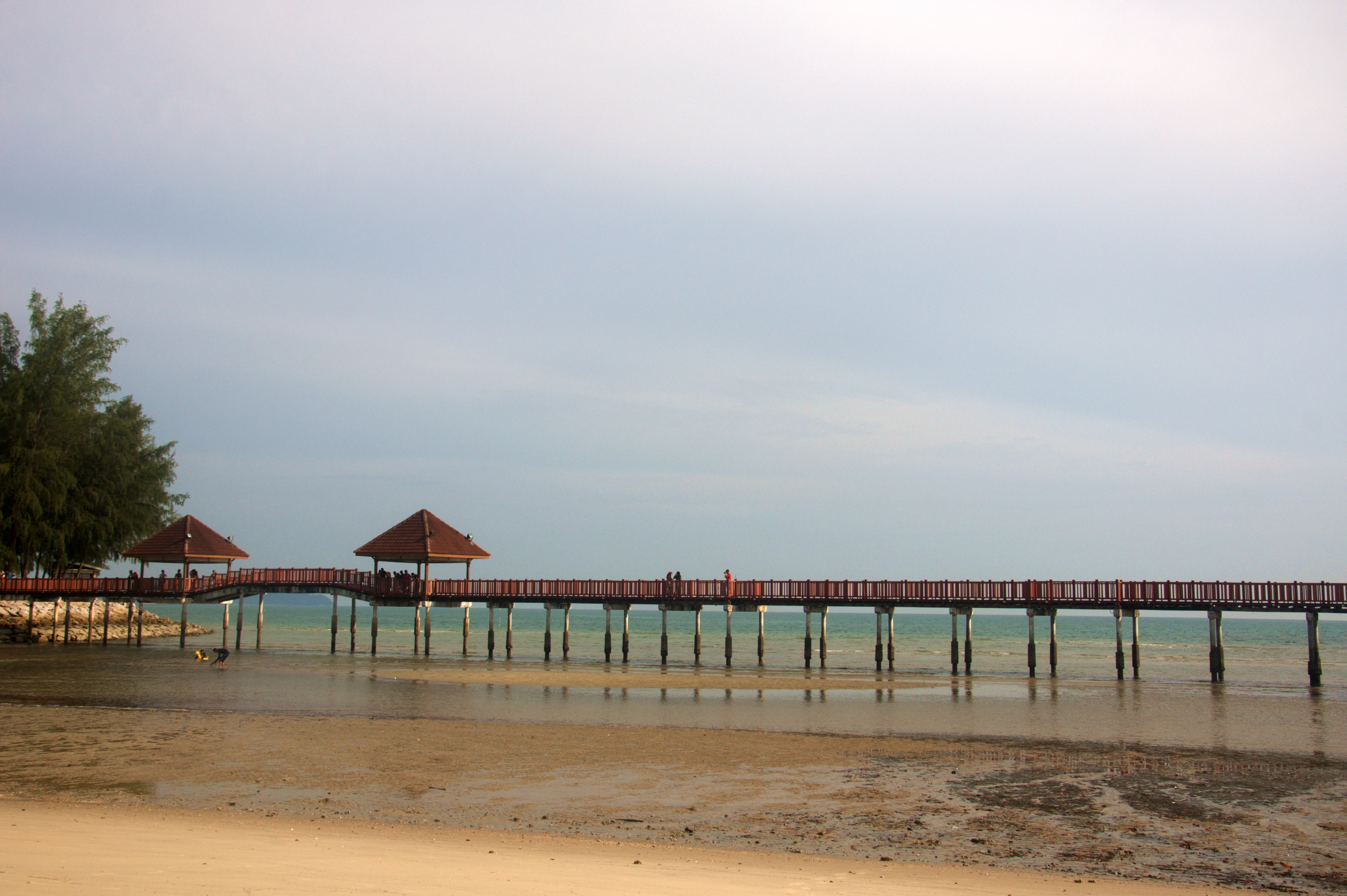
- From top, clockwise: Aerial view of downtown, PD Waterfront, Cahaya Negeri Beach, Royal Malay Regiment memorial, Teluk Kemang Beach, clock tower
- Etymology: John Frederick Dickson, Colonial Secretary of the Straits Settlements
- Nicknames: PD; Fort Knox of Malaysia; Bandar Tentera Darat ("Army Town"); Pantai Peranginan Negara ("The Nation's Beach Getaway")
- Location within Malaysia
- Coordinates: 2°31′N 101°48′E
- Country: Malaysia
- State: Negeri Sembilan
- District: Port Dickson
- Luak: Sungai Ujong
- Founded: 1889
- Establishment of local government: 1928
- Establishment of town board: 1950
- Establishment of district council: 1 December 1979
- Municipality status: 2 February 2002

Government
  - Type: Local government
  - Body: Port Dickson Municipal Council
  - President: Hasnor Abdul Hamid

Population (2020)
  - Total: 128,954
  - Demonym: Port Dicksonite/PDite/PD folk
- Time zone: UTC+8 (MST)
  - Summer (DST): Not observed
- Postcode: 71xxx
- Website: mppd.gov.my

Port Dickson (Negeri Sembilan Malay: Podeksen), colloquially referred to as PD, is a beach resort in Port Dickson District, Negeri Sembilan, Malaysia. It is the second largest urban area in the state after Seremban, the state capital. The town's administration is run by the Port Dickson Municipal Council (Malay: Majlis Perbandaran Port Dickson; MPPD), formerly known as the Port Dickson Sanitary Board (Malay: Lembaga Kesihatan Port Dickson) from 29 March 1928 until 28 February 1950, Port Dickson Town Board (Malay: Lembaga Bandaran Port Dickson) from 1 March 1950 until 30 November 1979, and Port Dickson District Council (Malay: Majlis Daerah Port Dickson) from 1 December 1979 until 1 February 2002.

== History ==
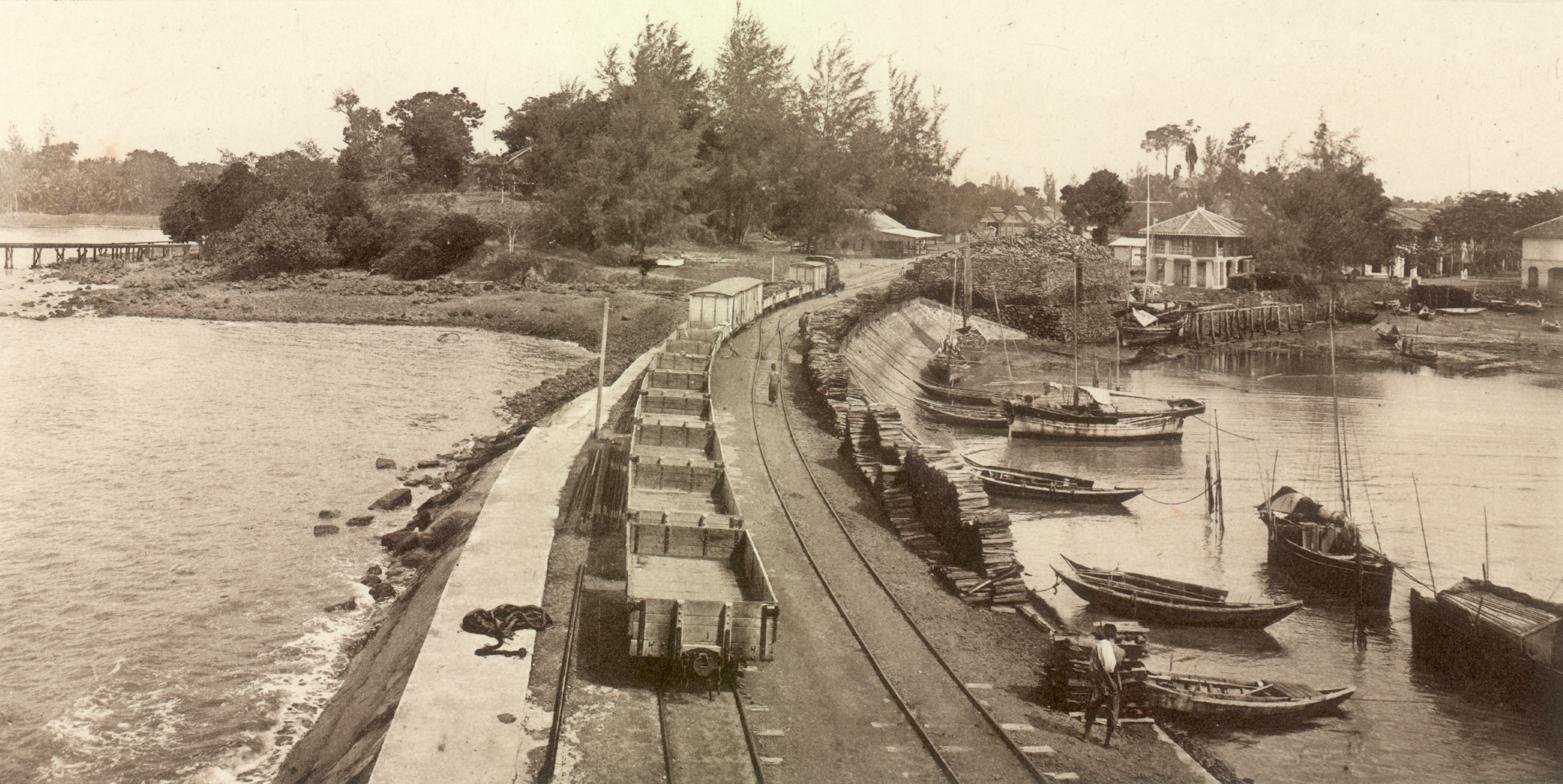
The western terminus of the Seremban–Port Dickson railway line. Downtown Port Dickson, 1910.

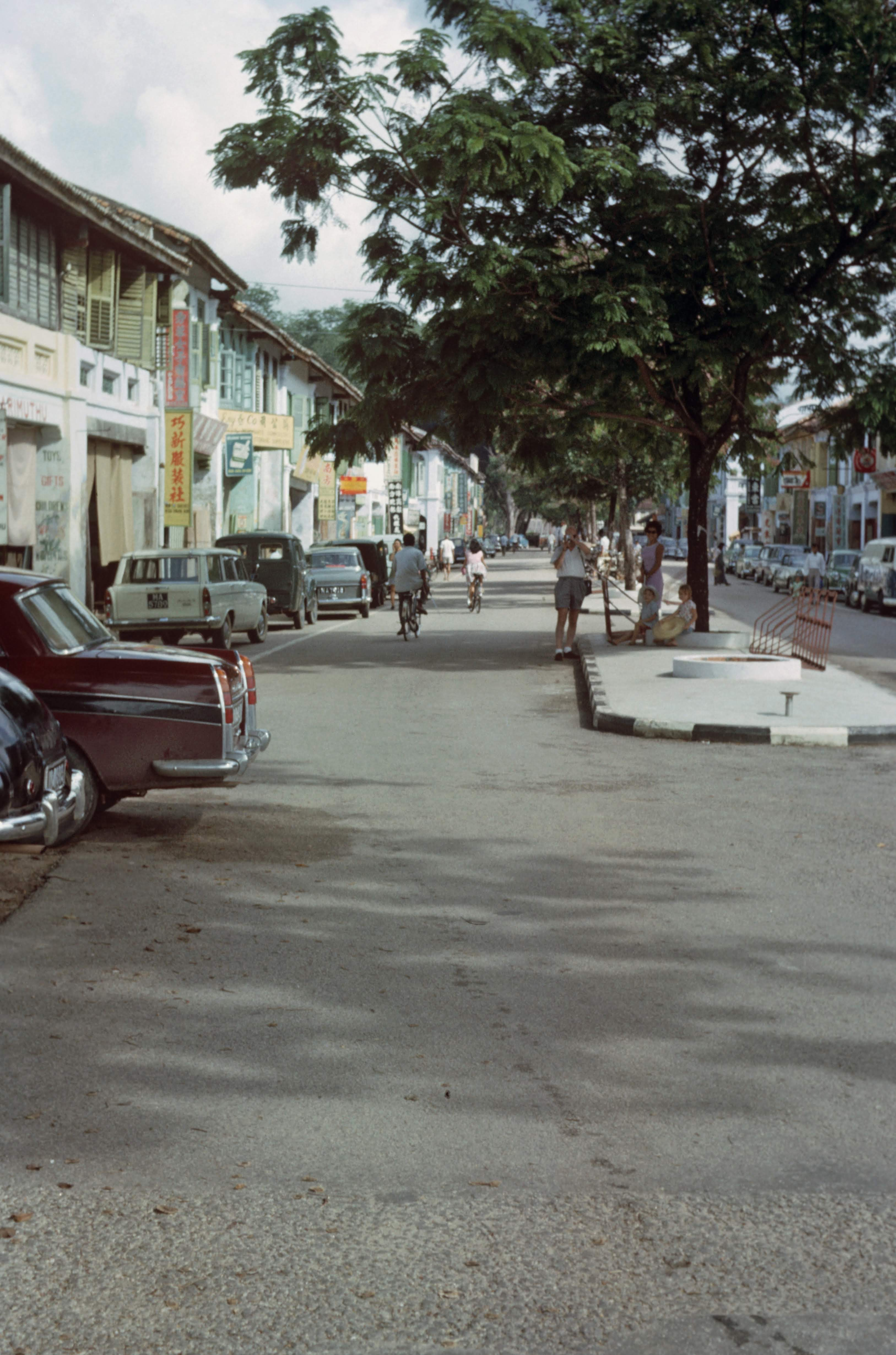
Downtown Port Dickson, circa 1964

Port Dickson used to produce charcoal and was therefore called Arang (Malay: "charcoal"). It was later developed as a small port by the British during the Straits Settlements period. Historically, what is today Port Dickson and nearby Lukut were part of the luak (chiefdom) of Kelang, one of the original nine that formed the first iteration of Negeri Sembilan in 1773. By the early 1800s, it had become part of Selangor. On 30 July 1880, a meeting was held in Singapore between Abdul Samad of Selangor (then sultan of Selangor), Raja Bot (the ruler of Lukut district), Dato' Kelana of Sungai Ujong, as well as the British, in which Selangor ceded the district of Lukut to Sungai Ujong (which later became the modern-day Negeri Sembilan).

Prewar shophouses line Jalan Raja Aman Shah in the downtown area.

Tin ore was plentiful in Lukut during the 1820s, and it attracted Chinese migrant miners. The British considered the area to have great potential as a harbour, and it was intended to supersede the port in Pengkalan Kempas. The name of the officer in charge was Dickson, and the town was thereafter named after him. Others claim that John Frederick Dickson, colonial secretary, a senior official of the Straits Settlements, founded Port Dickson and Pulau Arang in 1889.

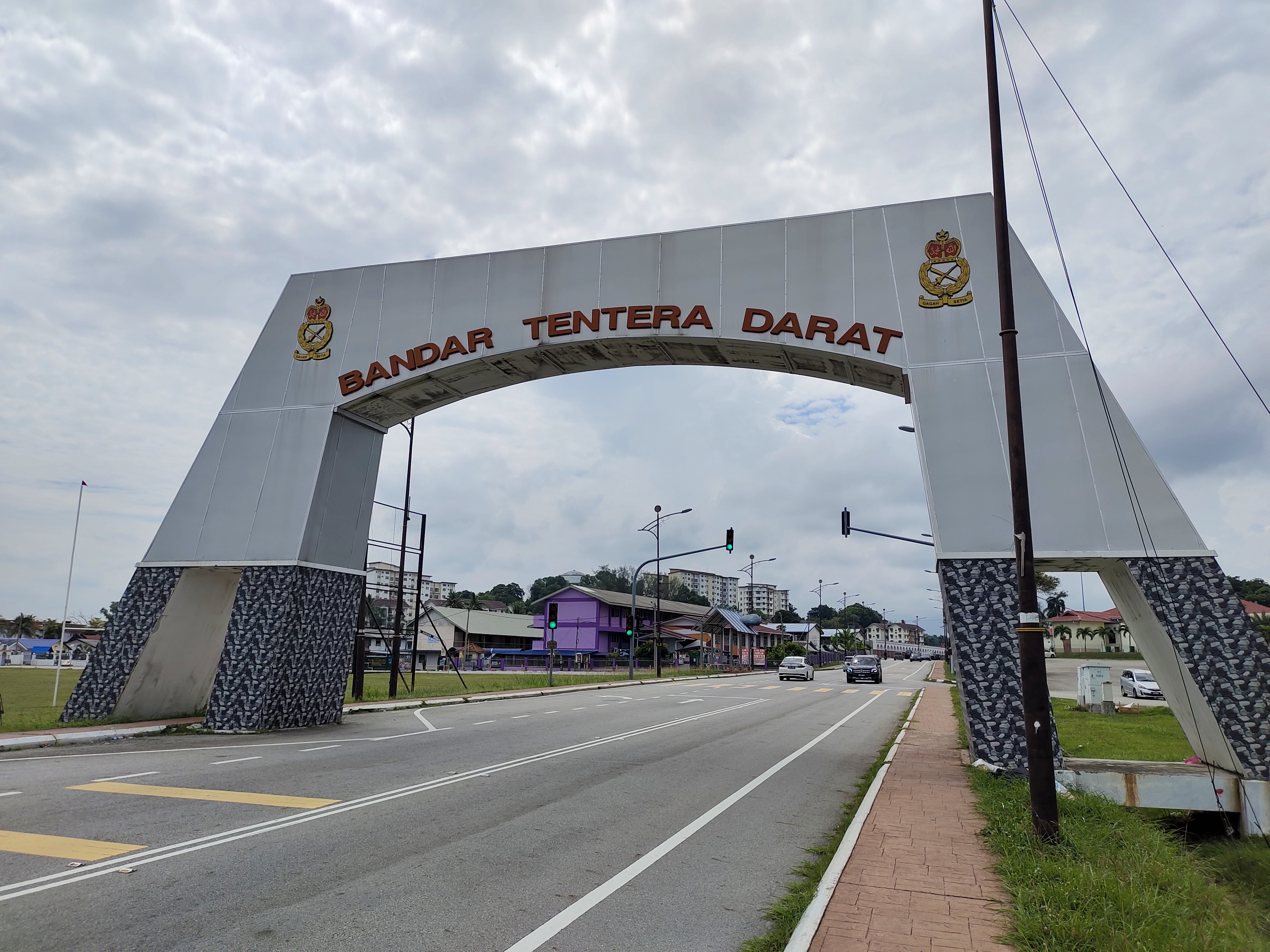
The neighbourhood of Si Rusa is famous for its numerous army camps.

Since 1933, Port Dickson has been home to a number of Malaysian Army camps, such as the Army Basic Training Centre, Sebatang Karah, Segenting, Si Rusa, and Sunggala.

== Economy ==
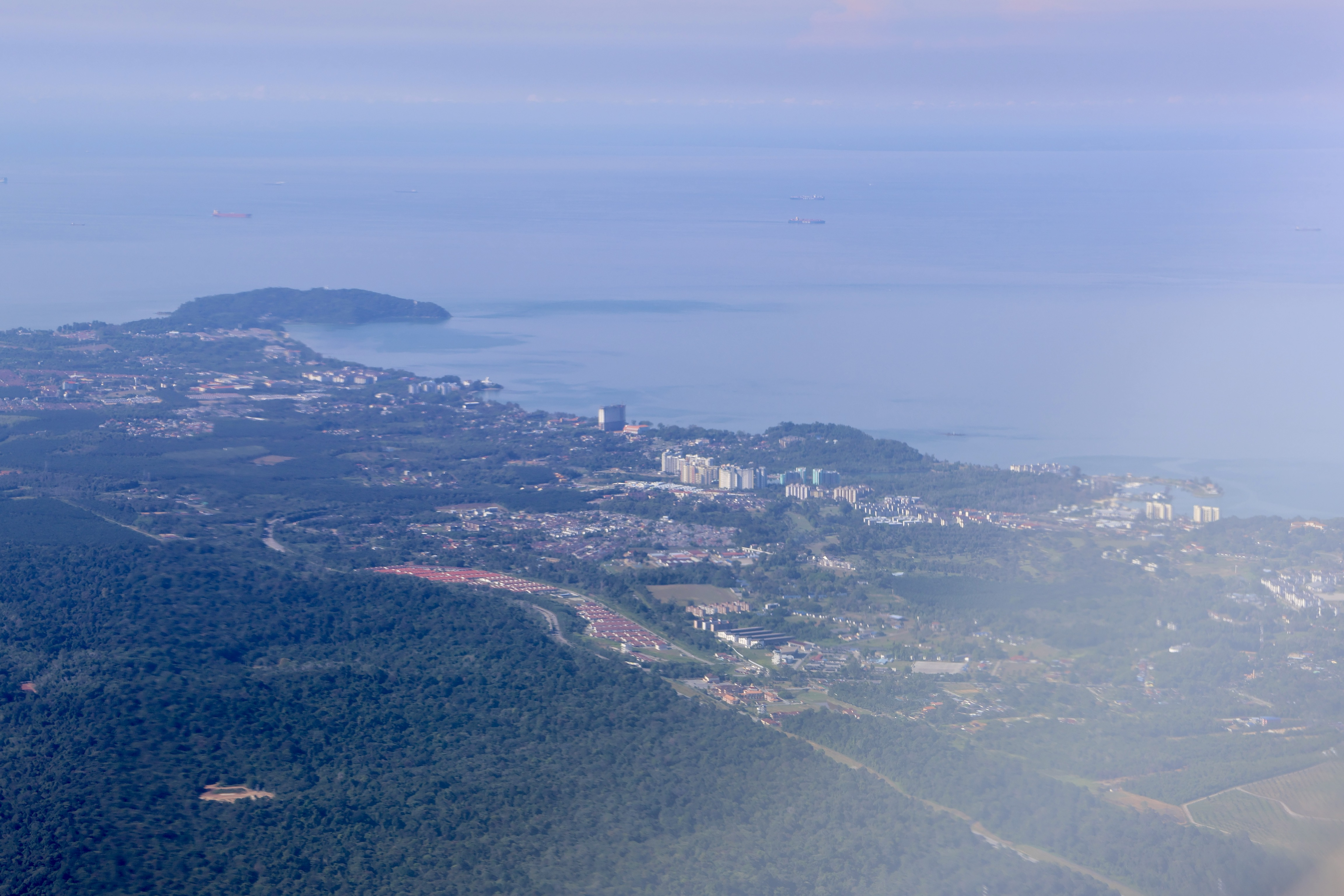
Aerial view of the southern suburbs of Port Dickson: Si Rusa, Sunggala, and Teluk Kemang. The peninsula of Tanjung Tuan (an exclave of Malacca) can be seen in the distance.

A resort town, Port Dickson thrives primarily on tourism. Nevertheless, there are other sectors that contribute to its economic growth. Along with Seremban, Port Dickson is part of the Malaysia Vision Valley, a growth corridor jointly initiated by both the federal and state governments that aims to develop the western half of Negeri Sembilan to complement existing development in the neighbouring Klang Valley and the Greater Kuala Lumpur area as a whole.

=== Oil and gas production ===
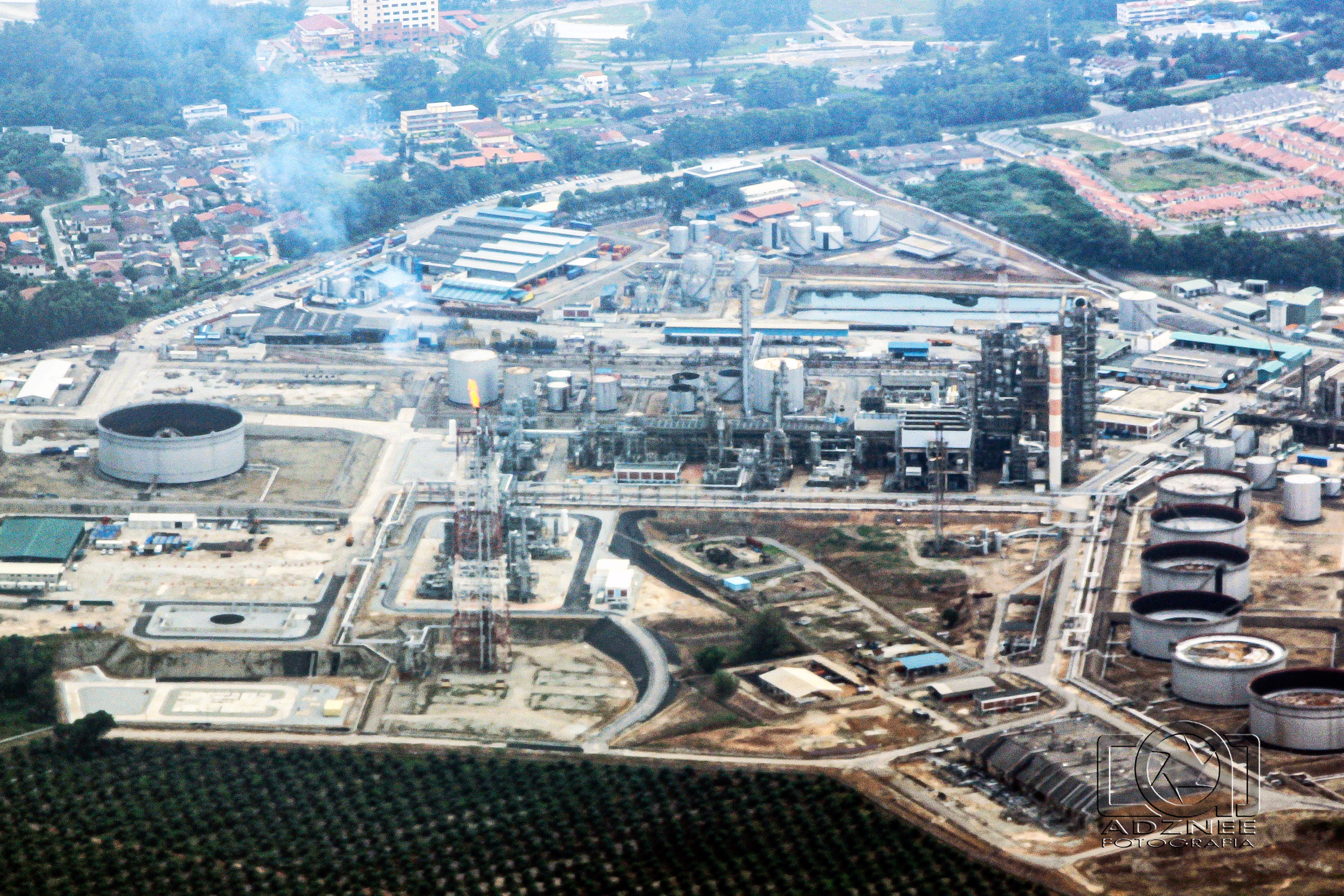
An oil refinery in Port Dickson

Port Dickson has two refineries, which make significant contributions to the local economy. Shell Refining Company (SRC) has been operating since 1962, while Petron (formerly ExxonMobil Malaysia) has been operating a refinery since 1963.

In 2016, SRC underwent a transition of its major shareholder to Malaysia Hengyuan International Limited, which holds an equity stake of 51.02 percent, and SRC was renamed Hengyuan Refining Company.

=== Tourism ===
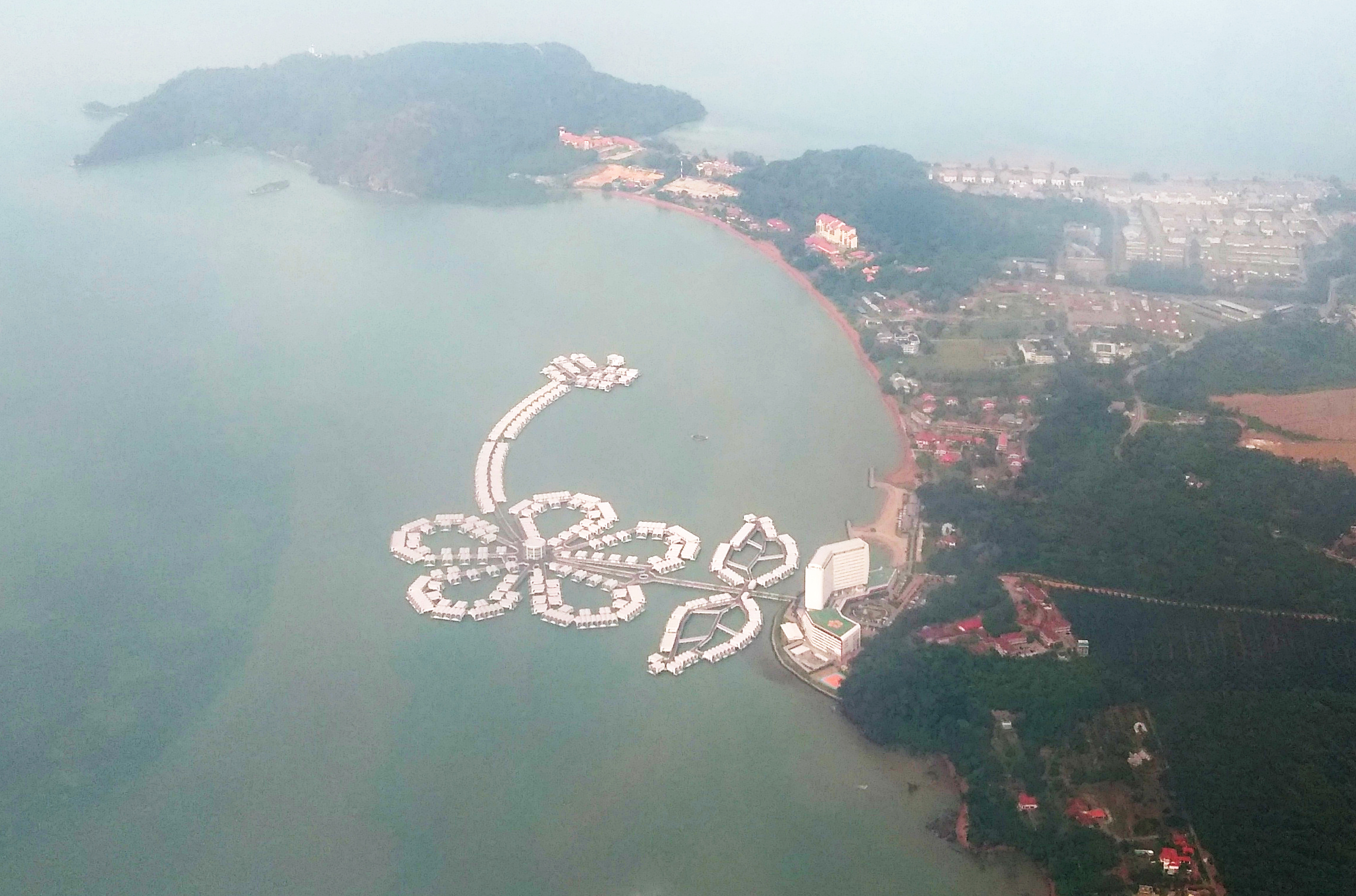
Lexis Hibiscus Port Dickson, with Tanjung Tuan jutting out into the Strait of Malacca to its right.

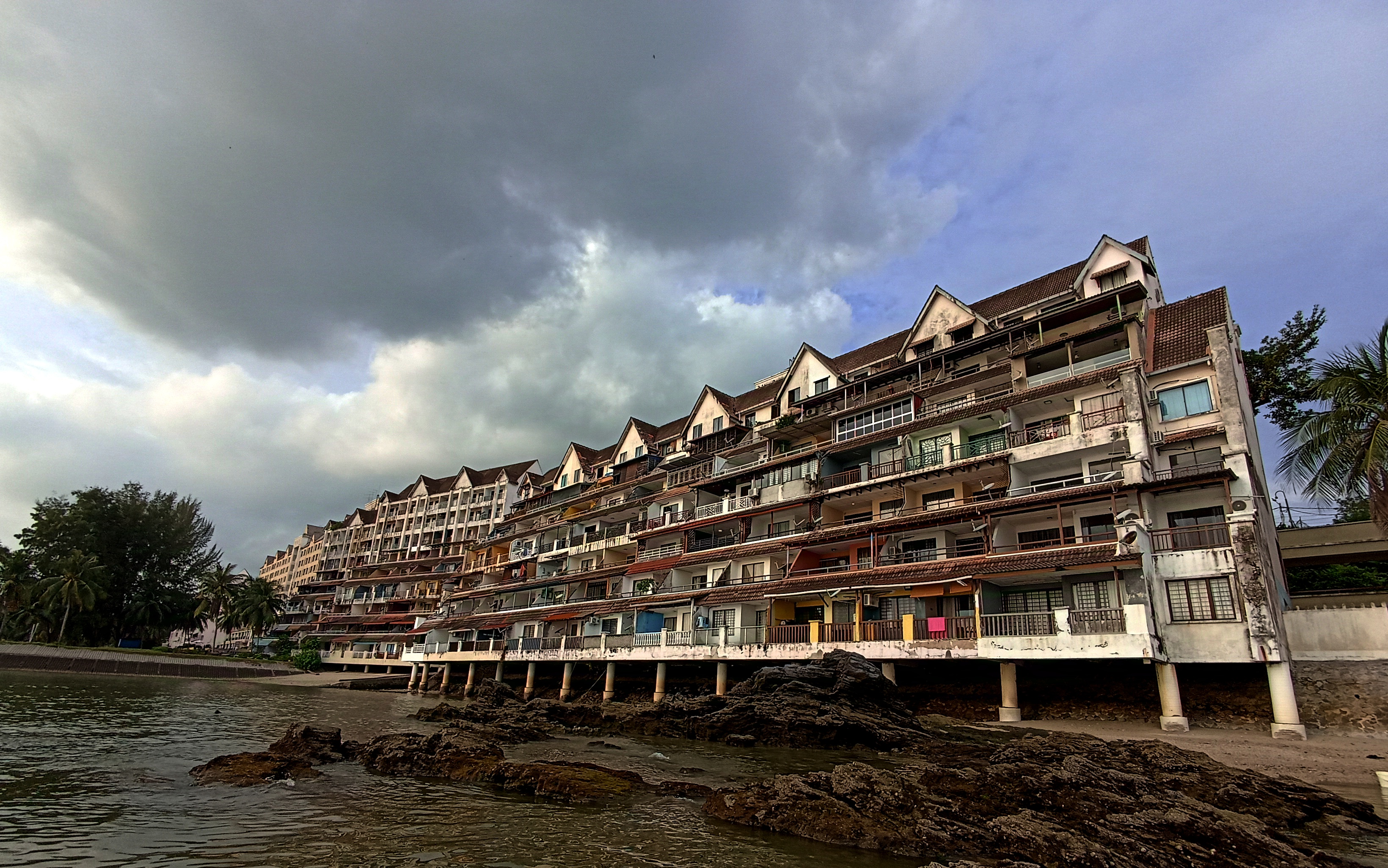
Blocks of holiday apartments at Bagan Pinang

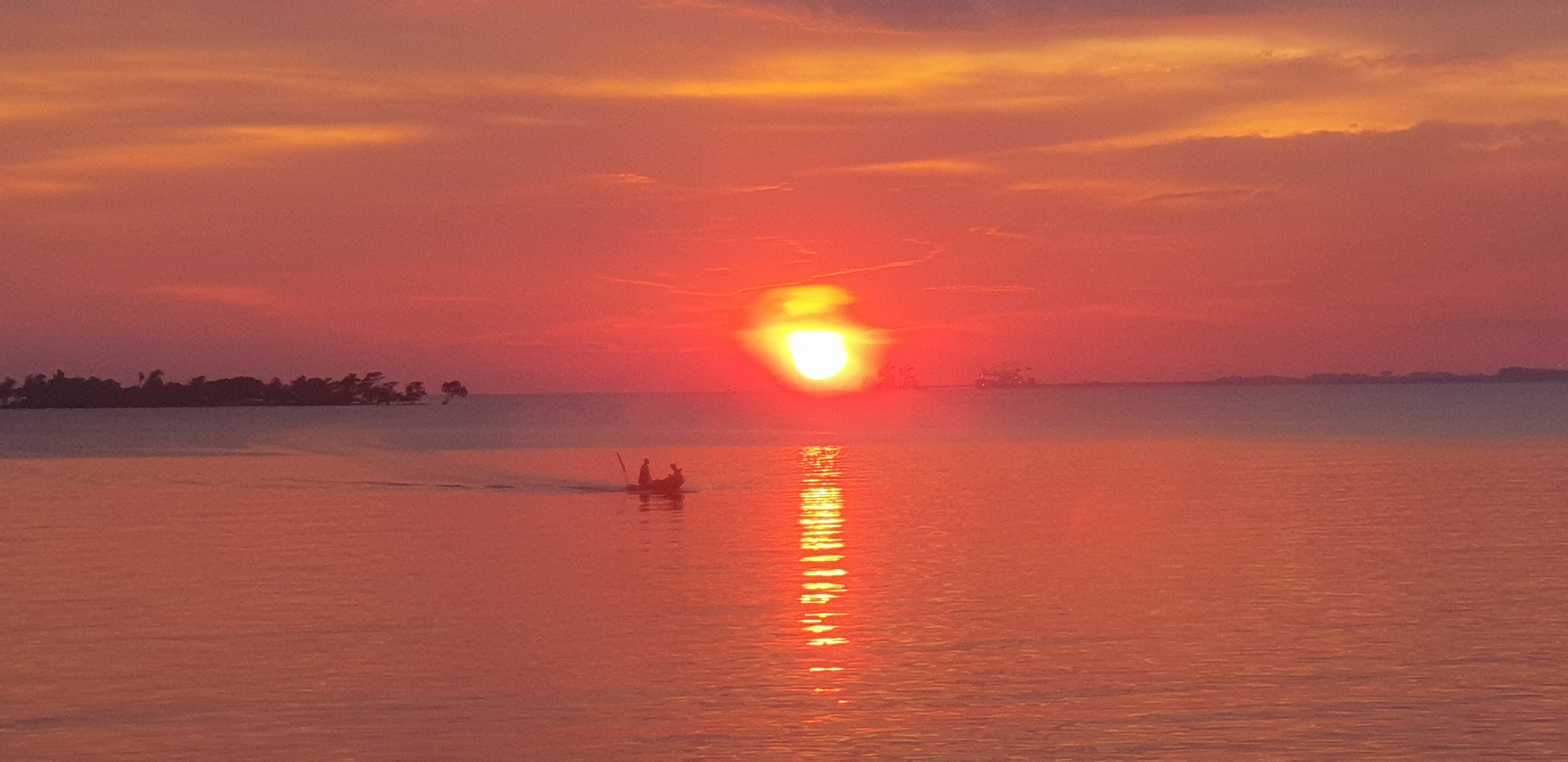
Sunset on a Port Dickson beach

The 18 km (11 mi) long beach from Tanjung Gemuk to Tanjung Tuan is a holiday destination for local visitors, especially those from the Klang Valley. Additionally, many Singaporeans have invested in holiday homes in and around Port Dickson. Over the years, many hotels and resorts were opened to capitalize on the tourist draw. In the 1990s, Port Dickson boomed, with new hotels and resorts being planned and constructed. Due to the 1997 Asian financial crisis, however, many of these projects stalled, leaving many unfinished buildings scattered along the Port Dickson coastline.

==== Sailing-related ====
Skyline of downtown Port Dickson from Regina Mall

Linking the Indian and Pacific Oceans, the Straits of Malacca is the shortest sea route between three of the world's most populous countries—India, China, and Indonesia. Inspired by the sea trade, expats founded the Royal Port Dickson Yacht Club (RPDYC) in 1927, which still offers dinghy sailing courses and runs regattas.

The newer, five-star Admiral Marina & Leisure Club has dock facilities for yacht travellers, sailboats, and luxury cruisers. It is a transit point for racing sailboats joining the Raja Muda Selangor International Regatta, Royal Langkawi International Regatta, and Thailand's Phuket King's Cup Regatta. Admiral Marina also hosted the disabled sailing events of the 2009 ASEAN ParaGames and the 2006 FESPIC Games.

=== Commerce ===
One of the largest companies originating from Port Dickson is Alpro Pharmacy. It was founded in 2001, with its first outlet set up at Oceanic Mall (currently Regina Mall). The company has numerous branches across Malaysia.

== Politics ==
The town is represented in the Dewan Rakyat of the Malaysian Parliament as the Port Dickson federal constituency. As of 2026, it is represented by Aminuddin Harun of the PKR.

In turn, Port Dickson contributes five seats to the Negeri Sembilan State Legislative Assembly:

- Lukut
- Chuah
- Sri Tanjung
- Bagan Pinang
- Linggi

== Transportation ==
=== Car ===
Port Dickson is easily accessible from most major towns in Peninsular Malaysia. The Seremban–Port Dickson Highway (operated by PLUS) or the Federal Route 53 connect the town to Seremban, the state capital.

Federal Route 5 runs through downtown Port Dickson and links it to Malacca and then Johor Bahru due south, or Kuala Langat, Klang, and Ipoh due north.

=== Public transportation ===
In the past, a 39 km-long branch line of the KTMB network linked Port Dickson to Seremban, but operations ceased in 2008. There were plans to reopen the line for freight and passenger services, but no activity had taken place by 2020. Starting in July 2022, the line was dismantled.

== Notable people ==
- Manikavagasam Harichandra (1930–2022), track and field athlete and 1956 Olympian.

== Gallery ==
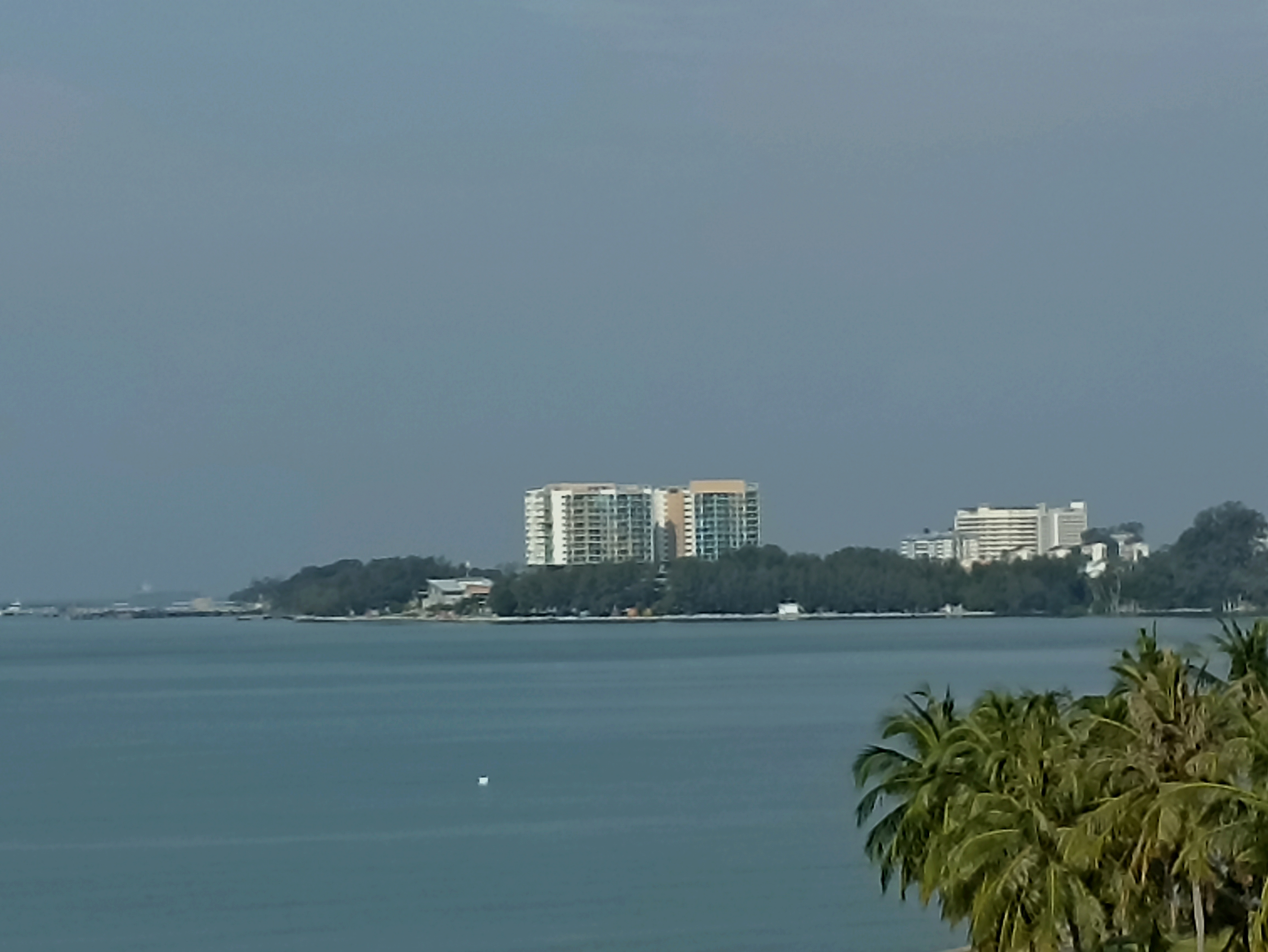
Downtown Port Dickson, as seen from Bagan Pinang

The uninhabitated islet of Arang Island, as seen from downtown Port Dickson

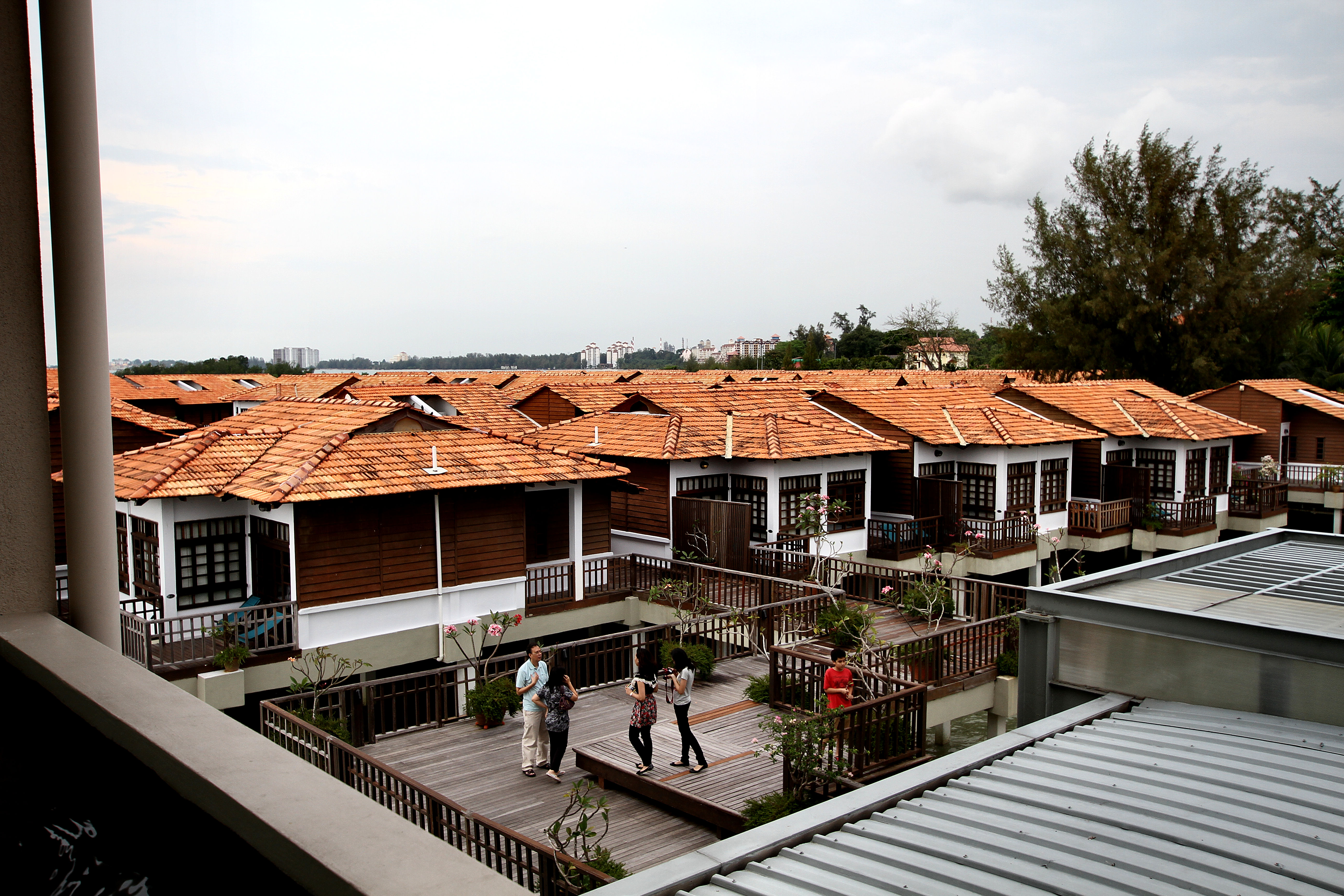
Water villas in Port Dickson

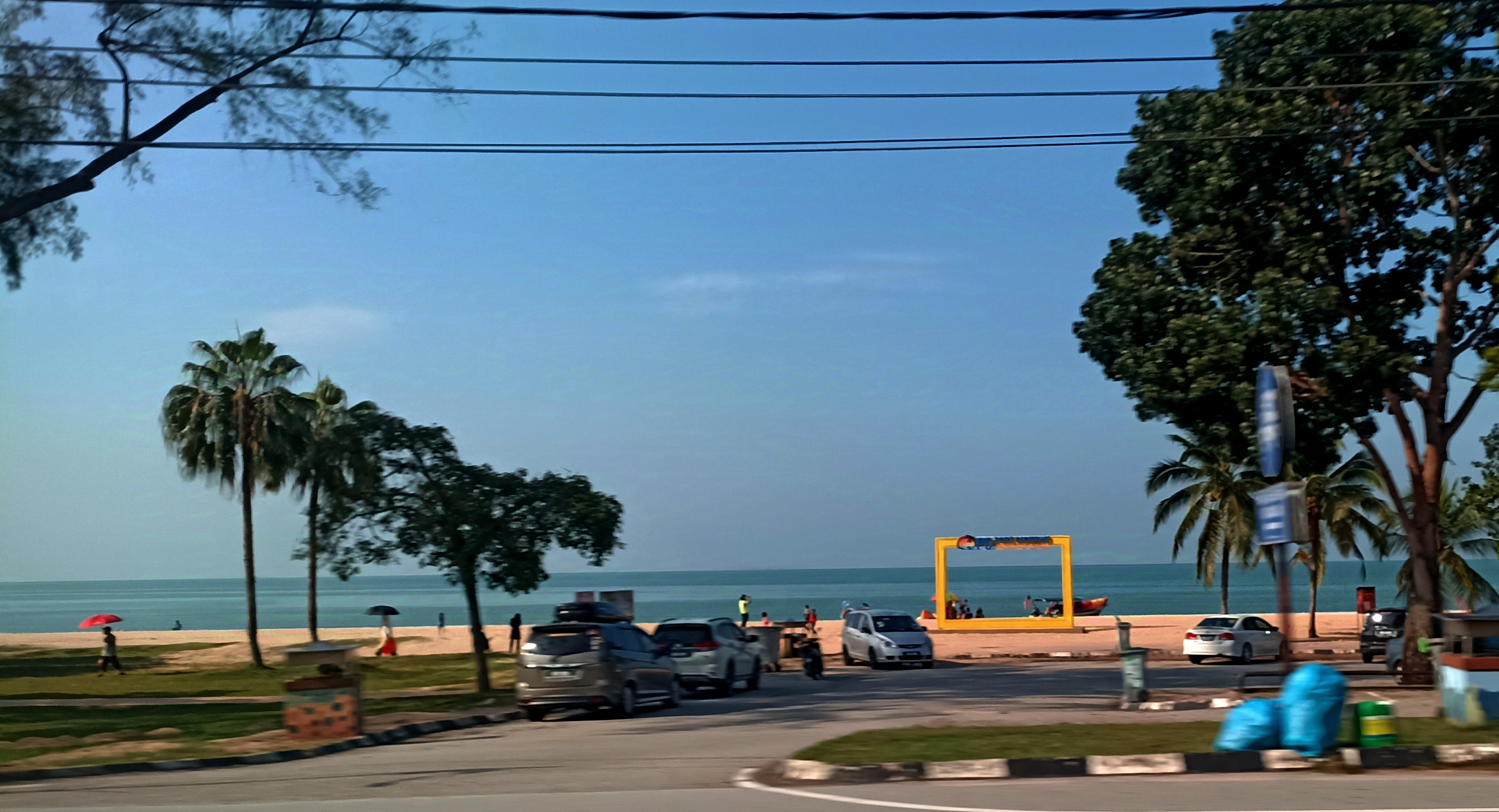
Saujana beach

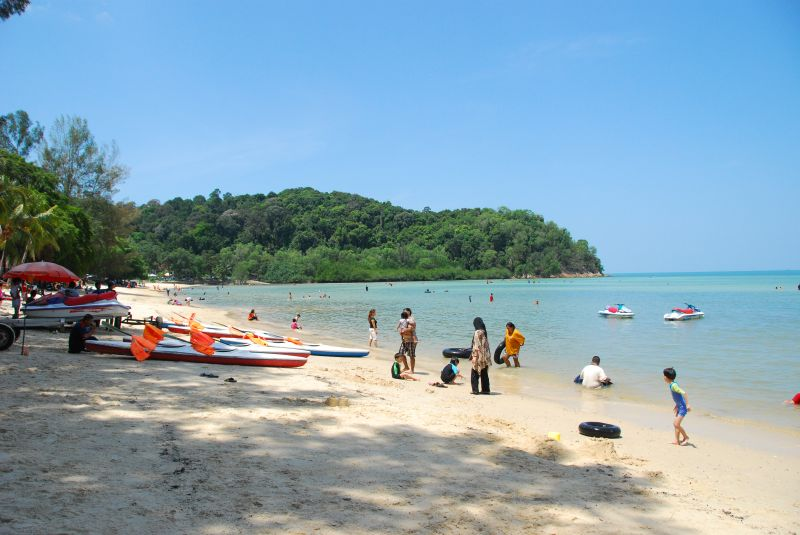
Tanjung Biru beach (Blue Lagoon)

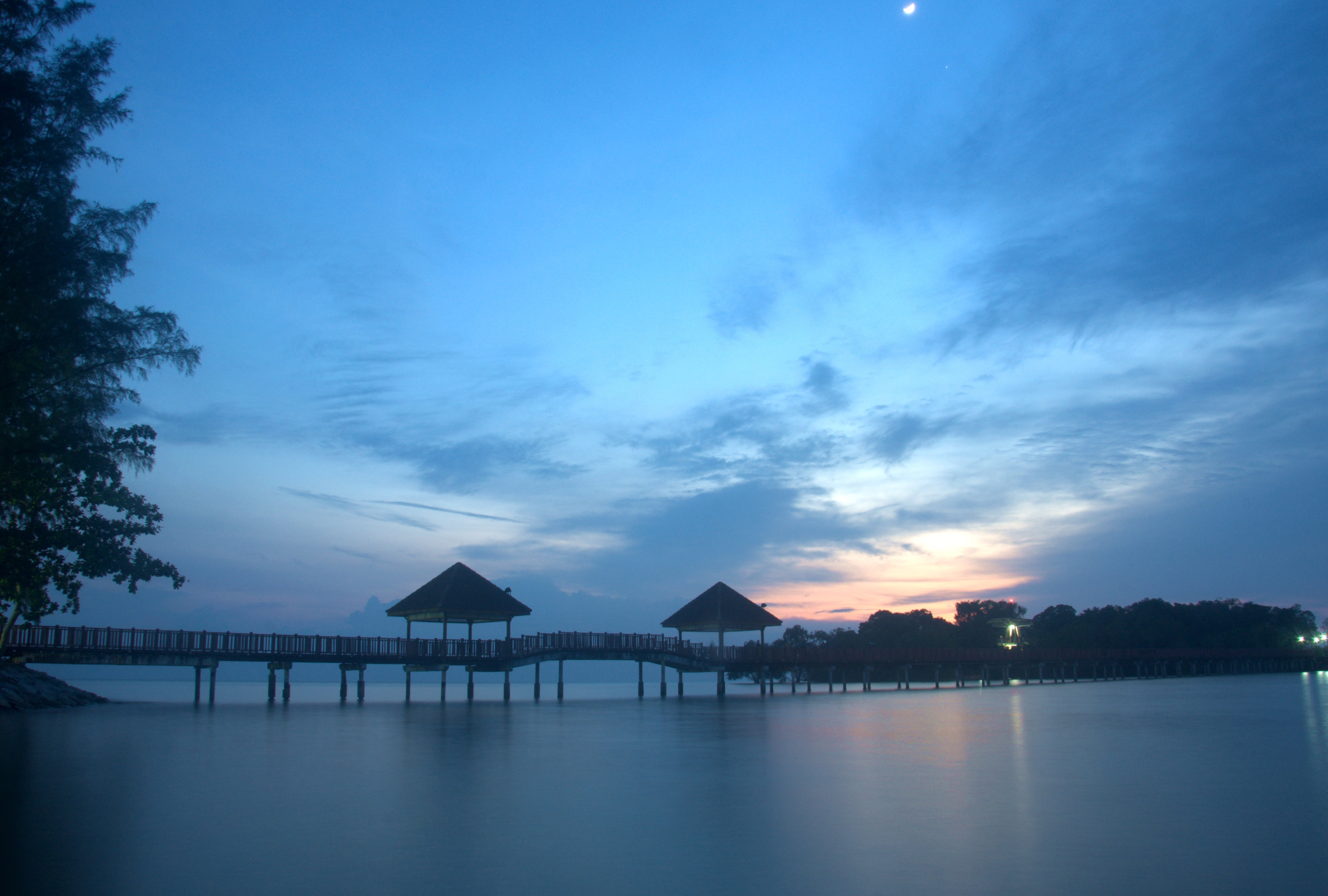
Cahaya Negeri beach

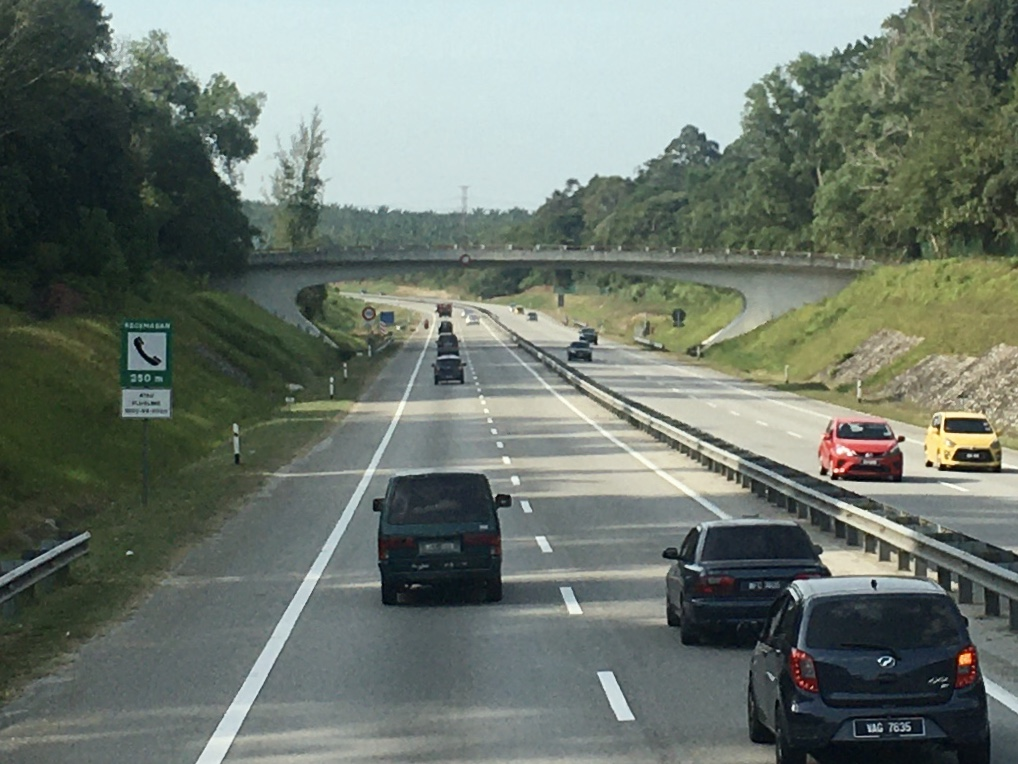
Seremban-Port Dickson Highway (eastbound towards Seremban)

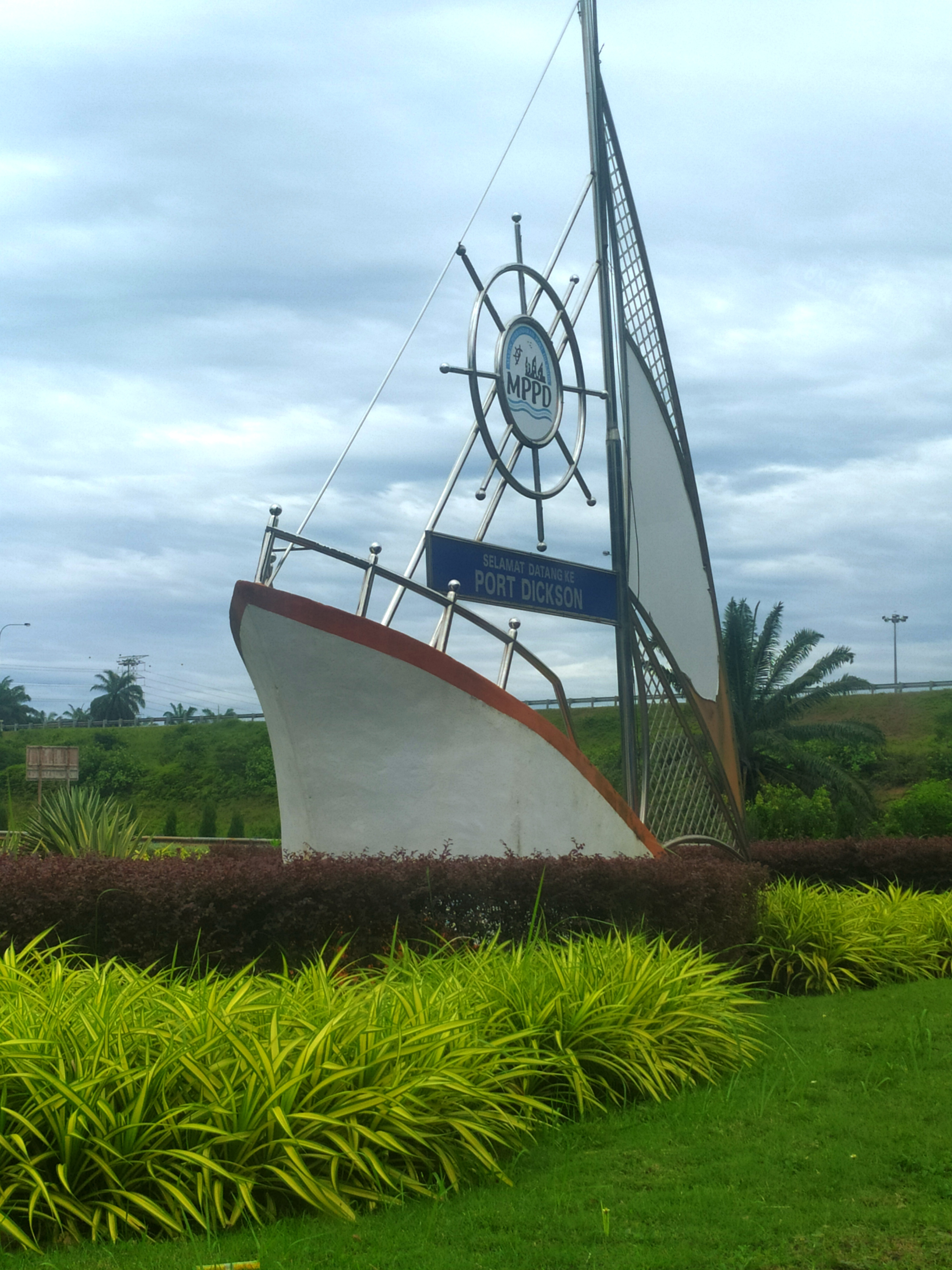
A landmark at the intersection of Federal Route 53 and the Seremban-Port Dickson Highway, near Lukut. The sign translates to "Welcome to Port Dickson".

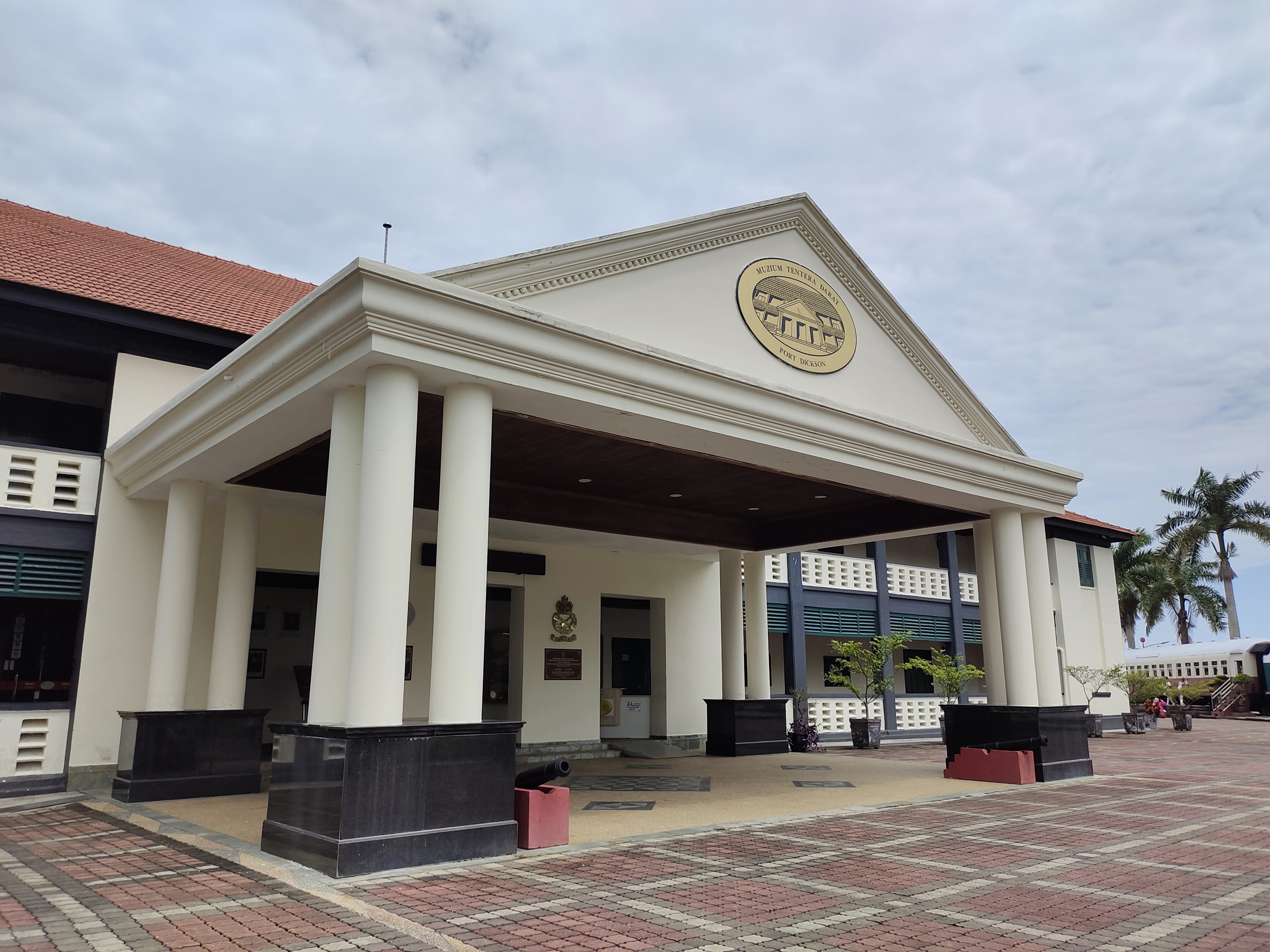
Army Museum

== See also ==
- Operation Zipper
