= Negeri Sembilan State Route N7 =

Road in Malaysia

Negeri Sembilan Route 7
- Jalan Rantau

Major junctions
- North end: Mambau
- FT 53 Federal Route 53; N100 Jalan Sega; N5 Jalan Sungai Gadut; N102 Jalan Rantau–Pedas; N6 Jalan Siliau; N8 Jalan Sungai Menyala; FT 5 Federal Route 5
- South end: Linggi

Location
- Country: Malaysia
- Primary destinations: Seremban, Mambau, Siliau, Rantau, Ayer Kuning, Rembau, Linggi, Port Dickson, Lubuk China

Highway system
- Highways in Malaysia; Expressways; Federal; State

Jalan Rantau, Negeri Sembilan State Route N7 is a major road in Negeri Sembilan, Malaysia.

== Junction lists ==
The entire route is located in Negeri Sembilan.

Legend:

- I/C - Interchange, I/S - Intersection, RSA - Rest and service area, OBR - Overhead bridge restaurant, R/R - Restaurant and rest plaza, L/B - Layby, V/P - Vista point, TN - tunnel, T/P - Toll plaza, BR - Bridge
- C - Cloverleaf, S - Stack, T-A - Trumpet-A, T-B - Trumpet-B, DT - Directional-T/Y, SDT - Semi-Directional-T/Y, P-Y - Partial-Y, D - Diamond, P-C - Partial cloverleaf, D-D - Diverging diamond, D-R - Direct ramp

District	Location	km	mi	Name	Destinations	Notes
Seremban	Mambau			Mambau	FT 53 Malaysia Federal Route 53 – Port Dickson, Nilai, Seremban; North–South Expressway Southern Route / AH2 – Kuala Lumpur, Johor Bahru; Seremban–Port Dickson Highway – Port Dickson, Lukut	Roundabout
Seremban	Mambau			Kampung Bemban Hilir		
Seremban	Rantau			Kampung Belangkang	Kampung Belangkang Ulu	
Seremban	Rantau			Taman Bunga Sejati	Kampung Nyatoh	
Seremban	Rantau			Kampung Kuala Sawah		
Seremban	Rantau			Taman Sri Rampai		
Seremban	Rantau			Jalan Sega	N100 Jalan Sega – Kampung Sega, Kampung Sega Tengah, Kampung Sega Hilir	T-junctions
Seremban	Rantau			Taman Kristal		
Seremban	Rantau			Kampung Kuala Sawah Pasir		
Seremban	Rantau			Kampung Dalam		
Seremban	Rantau			Kampung Masjid		
Seremban	Rantau			Kampung Takau	N5 Negeri Sembilan State Route N5 – Sungai Gadut, Seremban	T-junctions
Seremban	Rantau			Rantau		
Seremban	Rantau			Rantau	N102 Jalan Rantau–Pedas – Pedas	T-junctions
Seremban	Rantau			Rantau	Kampung Baharu	
Seremban	Rantau			Sungai Simin bridge		
Seremban	Rantau			Jalan Siliau	N6 Negeri Sembilan State Route N6 – Siliau, Port Dickson	T-junctions
Seremban	Rantau			Taman Cempaka Rantau		
Port Dickson	Air Kuning			Air Kuning	N8 Jalan Sungai Menyala – Sungai Menyala, Port Dickson, Teluk Kemang	T-junctions
Port Dickson	Linggi			Kampung Tampin Kiri		
Port Dickson	Linggi			Linggi	FT 5 Malaysia Federal Route 5 – Port Dickson, Teluk Kemang, Lubuk China, Alor Gajah, Malacca; North–South Expressway Southern Route / AH2 – Kuala Lumpur, Seremban, Johor Bahru	T-junctions
1.000 mi = 1.609 km; 1.000 km = 0.621 mi
