= Malaysia Federal Route 219 =

Road in Malaysia

Federal Route 219
- Sua Betong-Sunggala Highway

Route information
- Maintained by Malaysian Public Works Department
- Length: 3.71 km (2.31 mi)

Major junctions
- Northwest end: Sua Betong
- Seremban–Port Dickson Highway; N8 State Route N8; FT 363 Federal Route 363; FT 5 Federal Route 5
- Southwest end: Sunggala

Location
- Country: Malaysia
- Primary destinations: Seremban, Kuala Lumpur, Rantau, Port Dickson, Pasir Panjang, Malacca

Highway system
- Highways in Malaysia; Expressways; Federal; State

Sua Betong–Sunggala Highway, Federal Route 219, is a major highway in Port Dickson, Negeri Sembilan, Malaysia. It is also a main route to Seremban–Port Dickson Highway from south. The Kilometre Zero of the Federal Route 219 is located at Teluk Kemang Roundabout.

== Features ==
At most sections, the Federal Route 219 was built under the JKR R5 road standard, allowing maximum speed limit of up to 90 km/h.

== Junction lists ==
The entire route is located in Port Dickson District, Negeri Sembilan.

Legend:

- I/C - Interchange, I/S - Intersection, RSA - Rest and service area, OBR - Overhead bridge restaurant, R/R - Restaurant and rest plaza, L/B - Layby, V/P - Vista point, TN - tunnel, T/P - Toll plaza, BR - Bridge
- C - Cloverleaf, S - Stack, T-A - Trumpet-A, T-B - Trumpet-B, DT - Directional-T/Y, SDT - Semi-Directional-T/Y, P-Y - Partial-Y, D - Diamond, P-C - Partial cloverleaf, D-D - Diverging diamond, D-R - Direct ramp

Location	km	mi	Exit	Name	Destinations	Notes
Sua Betong			Through to Seremban–Port Dickson Highway			
Sua Betong	3.71	2.31	21903	Sua Betong I/S	N8 Negeri Sembilan State Route N8 – Sua Betong, Ayer Kuning, Rantau, Port Dickson, Recreational Beaches, Port Dickson Army Camp, Malaysian Army Museum, Royal Armour Corps (KAD) Museum, Malaysian Army Cemetery	4-way intersections
Sunggala			21902	Sunggala–Pasir Panjang Road I/S	FT 363 Malaysia Federal Route 363 – Pasir Panjang, Linggi, Malacca	3-way intersections
Sunggala				Kampung Sunggala		
Sunggala			Sungai Si Rusa bridge			
Sunggala	0.0	0.0	21901	Sunggala Roundabout	FT 5 Malaysia Federal Route 5 – Klang, Lukut, Port Dickson, Si Rusa, Recreational Beaches, Teluk Kemang, Tanjung Tuan (Malacca), Pasir Panjang, Malacca	Roundabout
1.000 mi = 1.609 km; 1.000 km = 0.621 mi: Route transition
