= Linsum Bridge =

Sungai Simin Bridge Jambatan Linsum
- Carries: Motor vehicles, Pedestrians
- Crosses: Simin River
- Official name: Linsum Bridge
- Maintained by: Malaysian Public Works Department (JKR) Seremban

Characteristics
- Design: ultra-high performance ductile concrete (UHPdC) bridge
- Total length: 50 m
- Width: --
- Longest span: --

History
- Designer: Government of Malaysia; Malaysian Public Works Department (JKR)
- Constructed by: Malaysian Public Works Department (JKR)
- Opened: June 6, 2011

The Linsum Bridge is a bridge in Kampung Linsum at Rantau, Negeri Sembilan, Malaysia which crossing Simin River. At the time of construction, the 50-metre bridge was the world's longest single span ultra-high performance ductile concrete (UHPdC) bridge, as the first of its kind in the country.
