= Negeri Sembilan State Route N8 =

Road in Malaysia

Negeri Sembilan Route 8
- Jalan Sungai Menyala

Major junctions
- West end: Port Dickson
- FT 5 Federal Route 5 FT 219 Sua Betong–Sunggala Highway; N7 State Route N7
- Northeast end: Ayer Kuning

Location
- Country: Malaysia
- Primary destinations: Sungai Menyala, Rantau

Highway system
- Highways in Malaysia; Expressways; Federal; State

Jalan Sungai Menyala, Negeri Sembilan State Route N8 is a major road in Negeri Sembilan, Malaysia. There are many Malaysian Army camps along this road. The Malaysian Army Museum is located along this road.

== Junction lists ==
The entire route is located in Port Dickson District, Negeri Sembilan.

Legend:

- I/C - Interchange, I/S - Intersection, RSA - Rest and service area, OBR - Overhead bridge restaurant, R/R - Restaurant and rest plaza, L/B - Layby, V/P - Vista point, TN - tunnel, T/P - Toll plaza, BR - Bridge
- C - Cloverleaf, S - Stack, T-A - Trumpet-A, T-B - Trumpet-B, DT - Directional-T/Y, SDT - Semi-Directional-T/Y, P-Y - Partial-Y, D - Diamond, P-C - Partial cloverleaf, D-D - Diverging diamond, D-R - Direct ramp

Location	km	mi	Name	Destinations	Notes
Port Dickson			Port Dickson; Si Rusa	FT 5 Malaysia Federal Route 5 – Port Dickson, Klang, Seremban, Teluk Kemang, Malacca	T-junctions
Port Dickson			Port Dickson Army Camp		
Port Dickson			Masjid Depoh Askar Melayu Diraja Port Dickson		
Port Dickson			Malaysian Army Parade Ground	Malaysian Army Parade Ground, Malaysian Army Memorial	T-junctions
Port Dickson			Port Dickson Army Camp		
Port Dickson			Malaysian Army Museum	Malaysian Army Museum, Malaysian Army Memorial	
Port Dickson			Kampung Baru Si Rusa		
Port Dickson			Malaysian Army Heroes Cemetery		
Port Dickson			Masjid Kariah Kampung Baru		
Port Dickson			Kor Armor Diraja Base		
Port Dickson			Kampung Baru		
Port Dickson			Malaysian Army Rifle Range		
Sua Betong			Sua Betong	FT 219 Sua Betong–Sunggala Highway – Teluk Kemang, Malacca; Seremban–Port Dickson Highway – Seremban, Kuala Lumpur, Johor Bahru	Junctions
Sua Betong			Malaysian Army Rifle Range		
Sua Betong			Sua Betong		
Sungai Menyala			Sungai Menyala		
Sungai Menyala			Kampung Baru Sungai Menyala		
Sungai Menyala			Sungai Linggi bridge		
Ayer Kuning			Kampung Barisan		
Ayer Kuning			Taman Barisan		
Ayer Kuning			Ayer Kuning	N7 Negeri Sembilan State Route N7 – Rantau, Siliau, Seremban, Linggi, Lubuk China, Malacca	T-junctions
1.000 mi = 1.609 km; 1.000 km = 0.621 mi
