= Negeri Sembilan State Route N5 =

Road in Malaysia

Negeri Sembilan Route 5
- Jalan Sungai Gadut

Major junctions
- Southwest end: Rantau
- N7 State Route N7; FT 1 Federal Route 1
- Northeast end: Federal Route 1

Location
- Country: Malaysia
- Primary destinations: Seremban, Senawang, Sungai Gadut, Rantau

Highway system
- Highways in Malaysia; Expressways; Federal; State

Jalan Sungai Gadut, Negeri Sembilan State Route N5 is a major road in Negeri Sembilan, Malaysia.

== Junction lists ==
The entire route is located in Seremban District, Negeri Sembilan.

Legend:

- I/C - Interchange, I/S - Intersection, RSA - Rest and service area, OBR - Overhead bridge restaurant, R/R - Restaurant and rest plaza, L/B - Layby, V/P - Vista point, TN - tunnel, T/P - Toll plaza, BR - Bridge
- C - Cloverleaf, S - Stack, T-A - Trumpet-A, T-B - Trumpet-B, DT - Directional-T/Y, SDT - Semi-Directional-T/Y, P-Y - Partial-Y, D - Diamond, P-C - Partial cloverleaf, D-D - Diverging diamond, D-R - Direct ramp

Location	km	Name	Destinations	Notes
Rantau		Rantau	N7 Negeri Sembilan State Route N7 – Mambau, Seremban, Ayer Kuning, Linggi, Malacca	T-junctions
Rantau		Kampung Ulu Lalang		
Rantau		Kampung Landas		
Sungai Gadut		Sungai Gadut		
Sungai Gadut		Sungai Gadut Estate		
Sungai Gadut		Taman Permata		
Sungai Gadut		SDAR campus	Sekolah Dato' Abdul Razak (SDAR) campus	
Sungai Gadut		Railway crossing bridge		
Sungai Gadut		Jalan Seremban–Rembau	FT 1 Malaysia Federal Route 1 – Seremban, Senawang, Rembau, Tampin; North–South Expressway Southern Route / AH2 – Kuala Lumpur, Johor Bahru	T-junctions
1.000 mi = 1.609 km; 1.000 km = 0.621 mi
