= Negeri Sembilan State Route N6 =

Road in Malaysia

Negeri Sembilan Route 6
- Jalan Siliau

Major junctions
- West end: Jalan Seremban–Port Dickson
- FT 53 Federal Route 53; N100 Jalan Sega; N7 State Route N7
- East end: Jalan Rantau

Location
- Country: Malaysia
- Primary destinations: Siliau, Rantau

Highway system
- Highways in Malaysia; Expressways; Federal; State

Jalan Siliau, Negeri Sembilan State Route N6 is a major road in Negeri Sembilan, Malaysia.

== Junction lists ==
The entire route is located in Negeri Sembilan.

Legend:

- I/C - Interchange, I/S - Intersection, RSA - Rest and service area, OBR - Overhead bridge restaurant, R/R - Restaurant and rest plaza, L/B - Layby, V/P - Vista point, TN - tunnel, T/P - Toll plaza, BR - Bridge
- C - Cloverleaf, S - Stack, T-A - Trumpet-A, T-B - Trumpet-B, DT - Directional-T/Y, SDT - Semi-Directional-T/Y, P-Y - Partial-Y, D - Diamond, P-C - Partial cloverleaf, D-D - Diverging diamond, D-R - Direct ramp

District	Location	km	mi	Name	Destinations	Notes
Port Dickson	Siliau			Jalan Seremban–Port Dickson	FT 53 Malaysia Federal Route 53 – Lukut, Port Dickson, Klang, Seremban, Nilai; North–South Expressway Southern Route / AH2 – Kuala Lumpur, Johor Bahru	Roundabout
Port Dickson	Siliau			Siliau Estate		
Port Dickson	Siliau			Railway crossing		
Port Dickson	Siliau			Siliau		
Seremban	Rantau			Jalan Sega	N100 Jalan Sega – Kampung Sega, Kampung Sega Tengah, Kampung Sega Hilir	T-junctions
Seremban	Rantau			Taman Seri Intan		
Seremban	Rantau			Sungai Linggi bridge		
Seremban	Rantau			Jalan Rantau	N7 Negeri Sembilan State Route N7 – Rantau, Seremban, Ayer Kuning, Linggi, Malacca	T-junctions
1.000 mi = 1.609 km; 1.000 km = 0.621 mi
