= Seremban 3 =

- Township
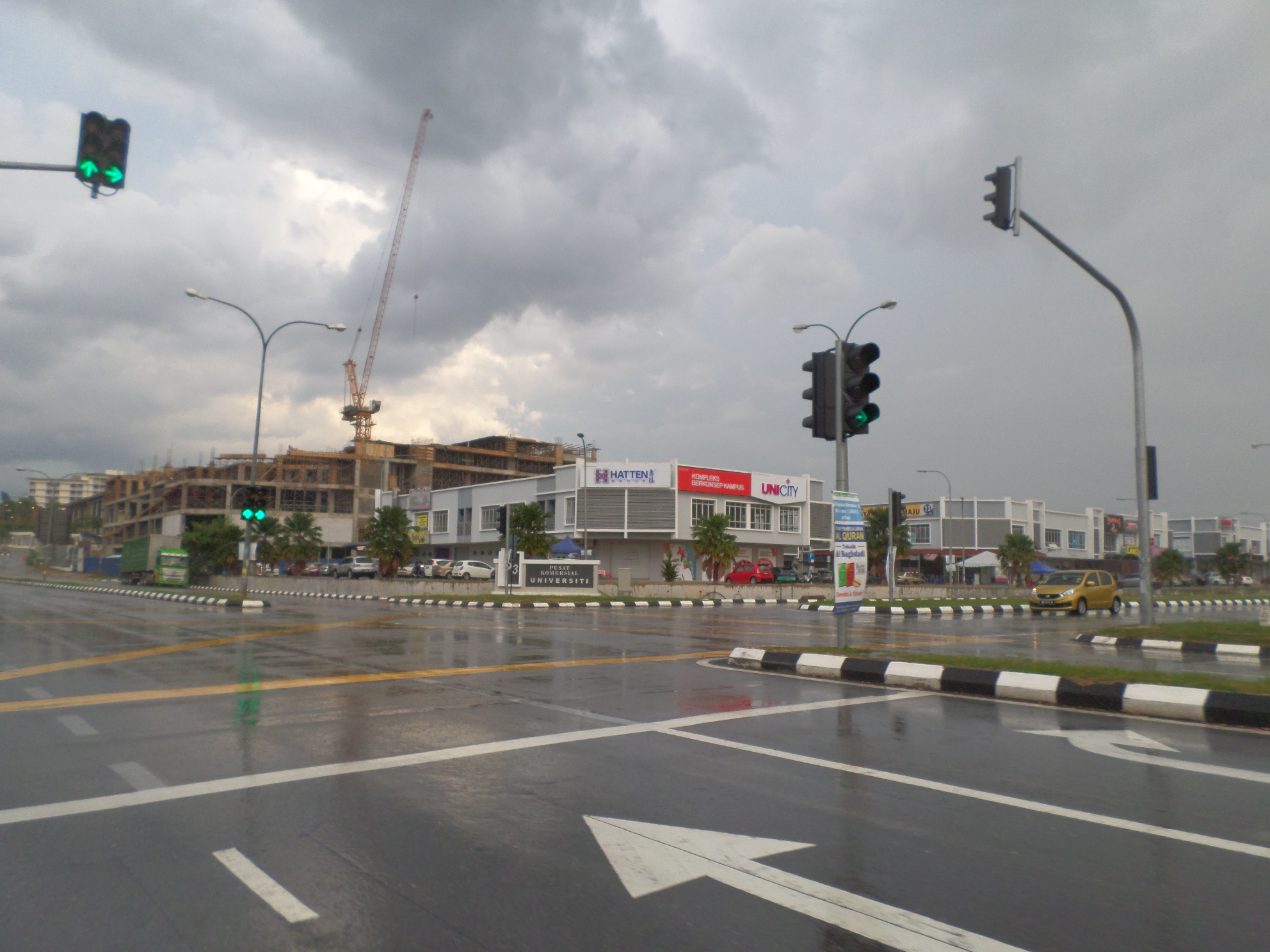
- Seremban 3

- Location of Seremban 3 Seremban 3 (Peninsular Malaysia) Seremban 3 (Malaysia)
- Coordinates: 2°40′25″N 101°55′52″E
- Country: Malaysia
- State: Negeri Sembilan
- District: Seremban
- Luak: Sungai Ujong

Government
  - Body: Seremban City Council
  - Mayor: Masri Baharuddin
  - MP: Cha Kee Chin (PH–DAP)
  - MLA: Lee Kai Yet (PH–DAP)
- Time zone: UTC+8 (MYT)
- Postcode: 70300

Seremban 3 (Malay: Seremban Tiga) is a suburb located about six kilometers south west of downtown Seremban in Negeri Sembilan, Malaysia. It is located between Rasah and Mambau.

Seremban 3 also have education centres such as Universiti Teknologi MARA campus in Seremban. However, Seremban 3 also have a shopping place like Unicity Mall.

== Educations ==
- Universiti Teknologi Mara
- SMK Seremban 3
