= Church of the Visitation (Seremban) =

Catholic church in Negeri Sembilan, Malaysia

Coordinates: 2°43′32″N 101°56′28″E

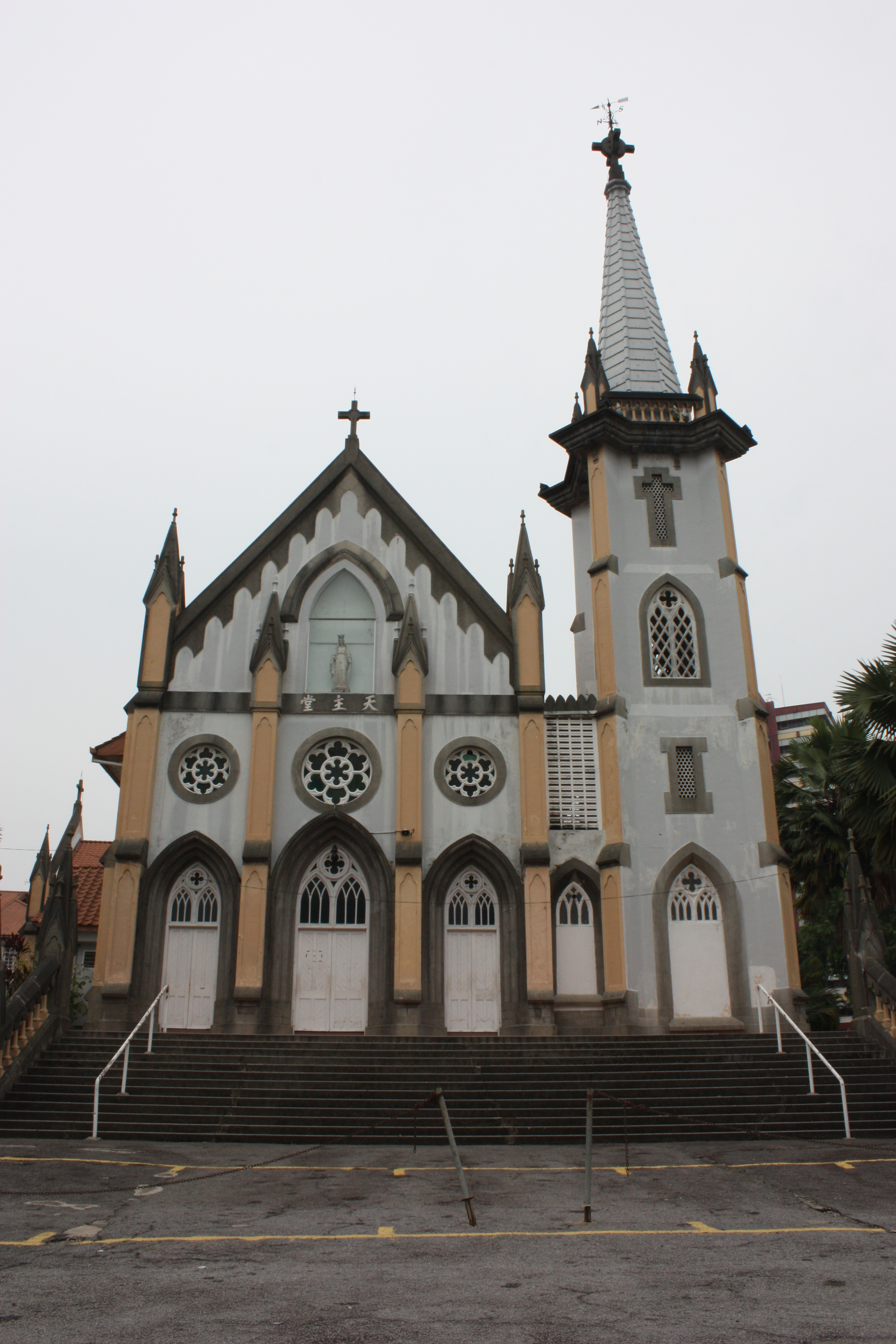
- Church of the Visitation
- Location: 85A Jalan Yam Tuan, 70000 Seremban, Negeri Sembilan
- Country: Malaysia
- Denomination: Roman Catholic
- Website: www.visitationseremban.org

History
- Status: Church

Architecture
- Functional status: Active
- Style: Gothic
- Completed: 1899 (original building) 1935 (rebuilt)

Administration
- Archdiocese: Kuala Lumpur

Clergy
- Archbishop: Julian Leow Beng Kim

Church of the Visitation, Seremban, is a Roman Catholic Church located in Seremban, Negeri Sembilan, Malaysia.

== History ==
The first missionaries to arrive in Seremban came from Malacca in the late 1840s after Bishop Jean Baptiste Boucho, Vicar Apostolic of Malacca-Singapore, had sent a French priest, Fr Pierre Favre to start a mission in the town. In 1848, Fr Pierre Henri Borie visited Seremban from Malacca, ministered to the small number of Christians there, and worked amongst the indigenous people, making it the oldest parish in the Roman Catholic Archdiocese of Kuala Lumpur.

In 1885, the first Christian chapel was erected in Seremban by Fr Hector Letessier, who was a young priest from St John's Church in Kuala Lumpur. He travelled to Malacca once every two months on horseback to hear confessions, and would break his journey at Seremban. He was granted a piece of land by the government on which he built an attap chapel which was dedicated to Our Lady of the Visitation, although it was said that it was named "more out of reference to Father Letessier's periodical stops than of deference to the Blessed Mother".

In 1888, the first resident priest, Fr Peter Perrichon, was appointed to the church parish, and that year the first baptism was recorded. The early congregation was made up of mostly government employees including the British Resident and his wife who were Catholics. After four years, Fr Letessier returned as parish priest who was succeeded by Fr Antonin Catesson who served from 1896 to 1904. Fr Catesson was tasked with raising funds for a new church and, having secured donations from wealthy Chinese from the nearby mining community, the new church was completed in 1899. In 1913, a presbytery was built, and in 1922, electrical lighting was installed.

In the 1930s, it was decided to build a larger church on the site as the number of Catholics in the community had rapidly increased. Retaining only the side walls, the nave was considerably lengthened, the roof raised, a new apse with two large wings added, and a steeple with a belfry erected. The new church was blessed in a ceremony on 22 September 1935 by Bishop Adrian Devals, Bishop of Malacca.

In 1996, a large hall, training rooms and a formation centre were added by Rev Anthony Thomas at a cost of RM2 million, and opened by Anthony Soter Fernandez, Archbishop of Kuala Lumpur. Later, these facilities were considered inadequate to house the increase in the number of Sunday school students, and the church acquired a four-story, adjacent building for RM 1 million which was officially opened on 7 February 2009 by Tan Sri Murphy Pakiam, Archbishop of Kuala Lumpur, and named "Wisma Visitation".

== See also ==
- Christianity in Malaysia
- Roman Catholicism in Malaysia
- Archdiocese of Kuala Lumpur
