= Taman Tuanku Jaafar =

Taman Tuanku Jaafar is a major township in Negeri Sembilan, Malaysia. It is located about 7 kilometres (4.3 mi) from Seremban. Taman Tuanku Jaafar is approximately 1 kilometre (0.62 mi) from Senawang. It was named after the tenth Yang di-Pertuan Besar of Negeri Sembilan, Tuanku Jaafar. The township can be accessed via Senawang Tol PLUS Highway and LEKAS Highway.

Tuanku Jaafar oversaw the construction of several schools such as Sekolah Kebangsaan Taman Tuanku Jaafar, Sekolah Kebangsaan Taman Tuanku Jaafar 2 & Sekolah Menengah Kebangsaan Taman Tuanku Jaafar, SK Senawang, SJKT Ladang Seremban and SJKT Ladang Senawang. Due to the rapid development and increase in population within the township, the nearby town of Sungai Gadut also saw much development including the construction of the Sungai Gadut Komuter station. Meanwhile, the commercial area of Taipan Senawang houses numerous banks, restaurants, provision stores and other amenities. Places of worship includes Kuil Sri Maha Raja Rajeswar & Masjid Kariah Taman Tuanku Jaafar.
