= Malaysia Federal Route 363 =

Road in Malaysia

Federal Route 363
- Sunggala–Pasir Panjang Road

Route information
- Maintained by Malaysian Public Works Department
- Length: 9.05 km (5.62 mi)

Major junctions
- Northwest end: Sunggala
- FT 219 Sua Betong–Sunggala Highway; FT 5 Federal Route 5
- Southwest end: Pasir Panjang

Location
- Country: Malaysia
- Primary destinations: Teluk Kemang

Highway system
- Highways in Malaysia; Expressways; Federal; State

Federal Route 363, Sunggala–Pasir Panjang Road is a major controlled-access highway in Port Dickson, Negeri Sembilan, Malaysia.

The Kilometre Zero of the Federal Route 219 is located at Pasir Panjang junctions.

At most sections, the bypass was built under the JKR R5 road standard, allowing maximum speed limit of up to 90 km/h.

On 13 February 2017, the Sunggala–Pasir Panjang Road is gazetted as Federal Route 363.

== Interchange lists ==
The entire route is located in Port Dickson District, Negeri Sembilan.

Legend:

- I/C - Interchange, I/S - Intersection, RSA - Rest and service area, OBR - Overhead bridge restaurant, R/R - Restaurant and rest plaza, L/B - Layby, V/P - Vista point, TN - tunnel, T/P - Toll plaza, BR - Bridge
- C - Cloverleaf, S - Stack, T-A - Trumpet-A, T-B - Trumpet-B, DT - Directional-T/Y, SDT - Semi-Directional-T/Y, P-Y - Partial-Y, D - Diamond, P-C - Partial cloverleaf, D-D - Diverging diamond, D-R - Direct ramp

Location	km	mi	Exit	Name	Destinations	Notes
Sunggala	9.05	5.62	3	Sunggala North I/S	FT 219 Sua Betong–Sunggala Highway – Sua Betong, Sunggala, Port Dickson, Teluk Kemang; Seremban–Port Dickson Highway – Seremban, Kuala Lumpur, Johor Bahru	3-way intersections
Teluk Kemang			2	Teluk Kemang North	Jalan Politeknik 10 – Taman Politeknik, Teluk Kemang, Politeknik Port Dickson	Diamond interchange
Pasir Panjang	0.0	0.0	1	Pasir Panjang I/S	FT 5 Malaysia Federal Route 5 – Teluk Kemang, Port Dickson, Tanjung Tuan (Malacca), Pasir Panjang, Linggi, Malacca, Eagle Ranch Resort	4-way intersections
1.000 mi = 1.609 km; 1.000 km = 0.621 mi
