= Rasah Jaya =

Malaysian township

- Township
- Rasah Jaya in Negeri Sembilan, Malay Peninsular and Malaysia Rasah Jaya (Peninsular Malaysia) Rasah Jaya (Malaysia)
- Coordinates: 2°40′48″N 101°56′41″E
- Country: Malaysia
- State: Negeri Sembilan
- District: Seremban
- Luak: Sungai Ujong
- Established: 1982

Government
  - Body: Seremban City Council
  - Mayor: Masri Baharuddin
  - MP: Cha Kee Chin (PH–DAP)
  - MLA: Lee Kai Yet (PH–DAP)
- Time zone: UTC+8 (MYT)
- Postcode: 70300

Rasah Jaya is a township in Rasah mukim of Seremban District, Negeri Sembilan, Malaysia. This township was established in 1982. It is located in the southern part of Seremban.

== Educations ==
- Sekolah Kebangsaan Taman Rasah Jaya
