= Rasah =

Coordinates: 2°42′N 101°56′E

- Mukim and Suburb of Seremban
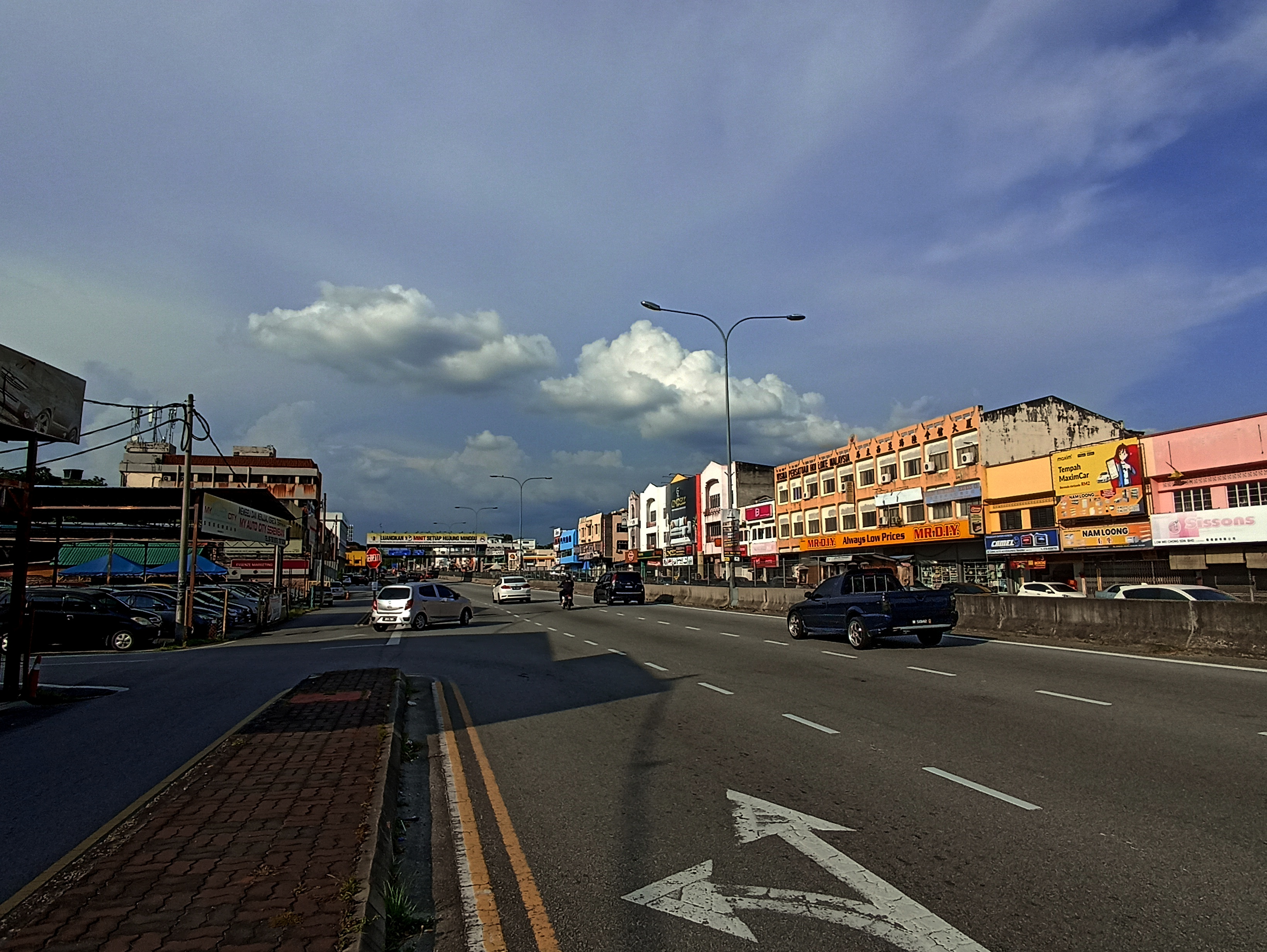
- Jalan Rasah (part of Federal Route 53) cuts through Rasah. Looking east towards the city centre
- Interactive map of Rasah
- Country: Malaysia
- State: Negeri Sembilan
- District: Seremban
- Luak: Sungai Ujong

Government
  - Body: Seremban City Council
  - Mayor: Masri Baharuddin
  - MP: Cha Kee Chin (PH–DAP)
  - MLA: Siau Meow Kong (PH–DAP)
- Time zone: UTC+8 (MST)
- Postcode: 70300

Rasah in Seremban District

Rasah is a mukim in Seremban District, Negeri Sembilan, Malaysia.

== Places of worship ==
There are places of worship for many faiths in Rasah. The most prominent one is Rasah Shri Mahamariamman Temple, situated in the foothills near the Tuanku Ja'afar Hospital.

== Demographics ==
In terms of the ethnic make-up of the population, Rasah consist of 33.5% Malay, 33.4% Indian, 28.4% Chinese, 4.3% Non-citizens and 0.4% others.

== Housing estates ==
Rasah has many housing estates encircling it including Kampung Dato Mansor, Kampung Pasir, Taman Sri Pulasan, Taman Lian, Taman Nee Yan, Taman Klana Jubli, Taman Bukit Chedang, Taman Dato' Raja Mohd Hanifah, Taman Rasah, Rasah Jaya, Taman Desa Rasah, Taman Harapan Baru, Taman Happy, Taman Thivy Jaya, Taman Sri Putih, Taman Nuri Indah, Taman Anggur, Taman Bukit Rasah, Taman Belimbing and Taman Limau Emas.

== Notable people ==
- Sheikh Haji Muhammad Saleh (also known as Tuanku Tambusai) - a leader during the Padri War in 1838
