= Siliau =

- Town in Malaysia

Other transcription(s)
  - Tamil: சிலியாவ்
- Siliau in Negeri Sembilan, Malay Peninsular and Malaysia Siliau (Peninsular Malaysia) Siliau (Malaysia)
- Country: Malaysia
- State: Negeri Sembilan
- District: Port Dickson
- Time zone: UTC+8 (MYT)
- Postal code: 71100

Siliau (Tamil: சிலியாவ்) is a small town in Port Dickson District, Negeri Sembilan, Malaysia. The origin of the name is disputed but one source has it that it derives from the colloquial Hokkien dialect brought by southern Hokkien emigrants to Malaysia in the late 19th century. According to a local tradition, a group of Hokkien emigrants purchased a parcel of land in the Lukut district in 1903 through a middleman. Their intention was to farm the land. When they actually arrived to take possession of their land and saw how barren and infertile it was, a man threw up his hand in despair and said si liau, which is colloquial Hokkien for "we're finished."
