= Seremban =

Seremban Somban (Negeri Sembilan Malay) Sungai Ujong
- State capital city and district capital
- City of Seremban Bandaraya Seremban (Malay)
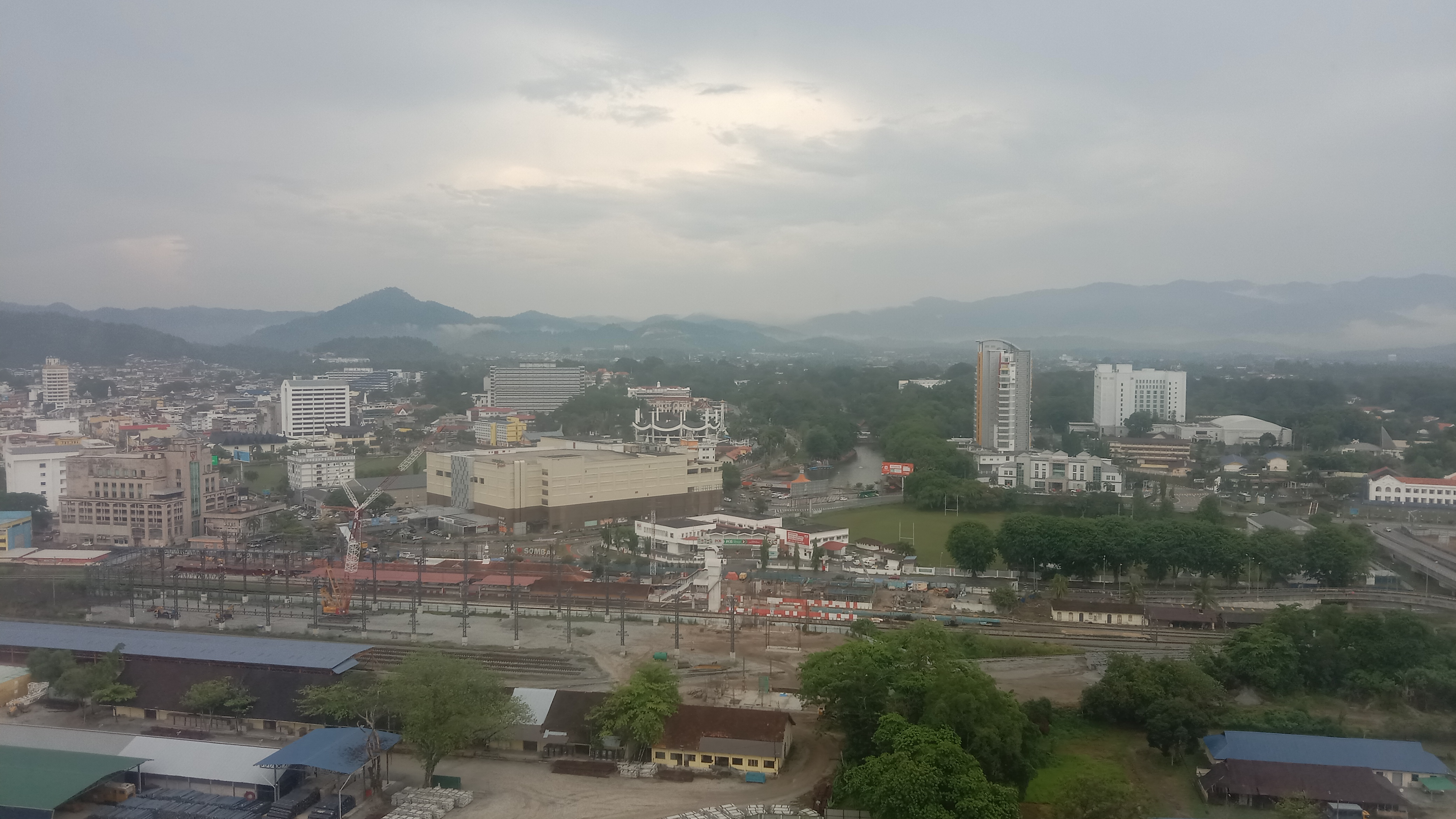
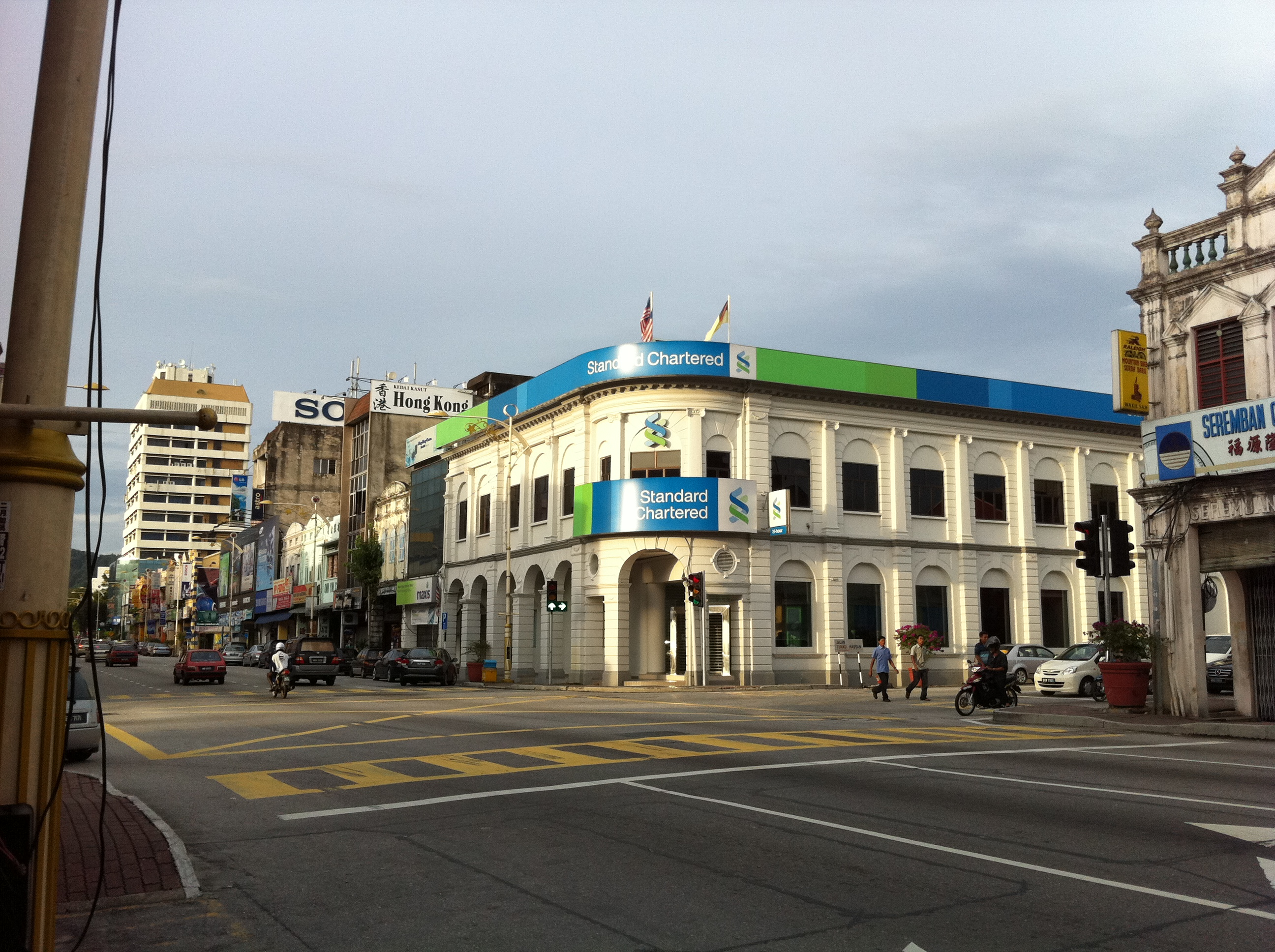
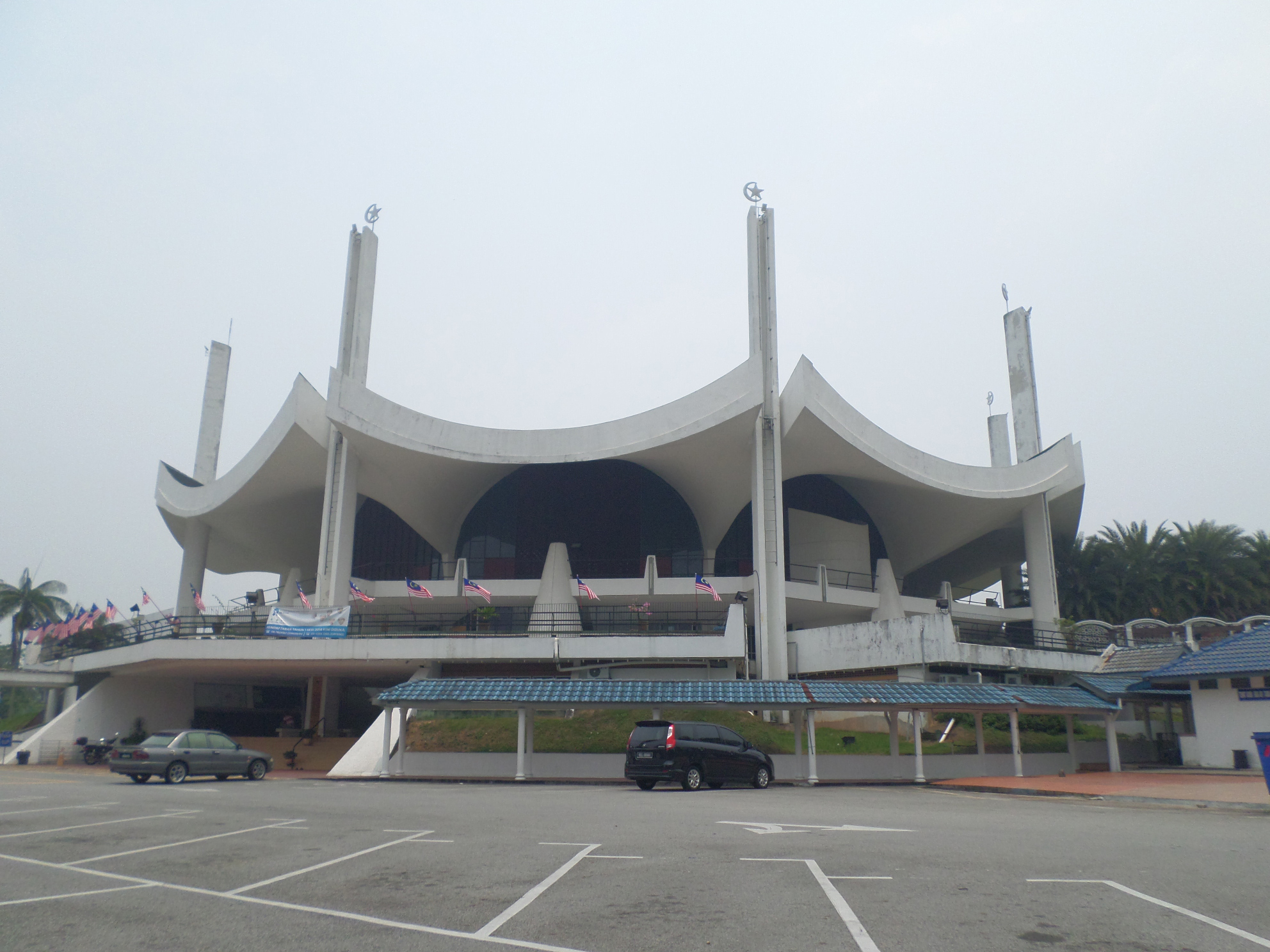
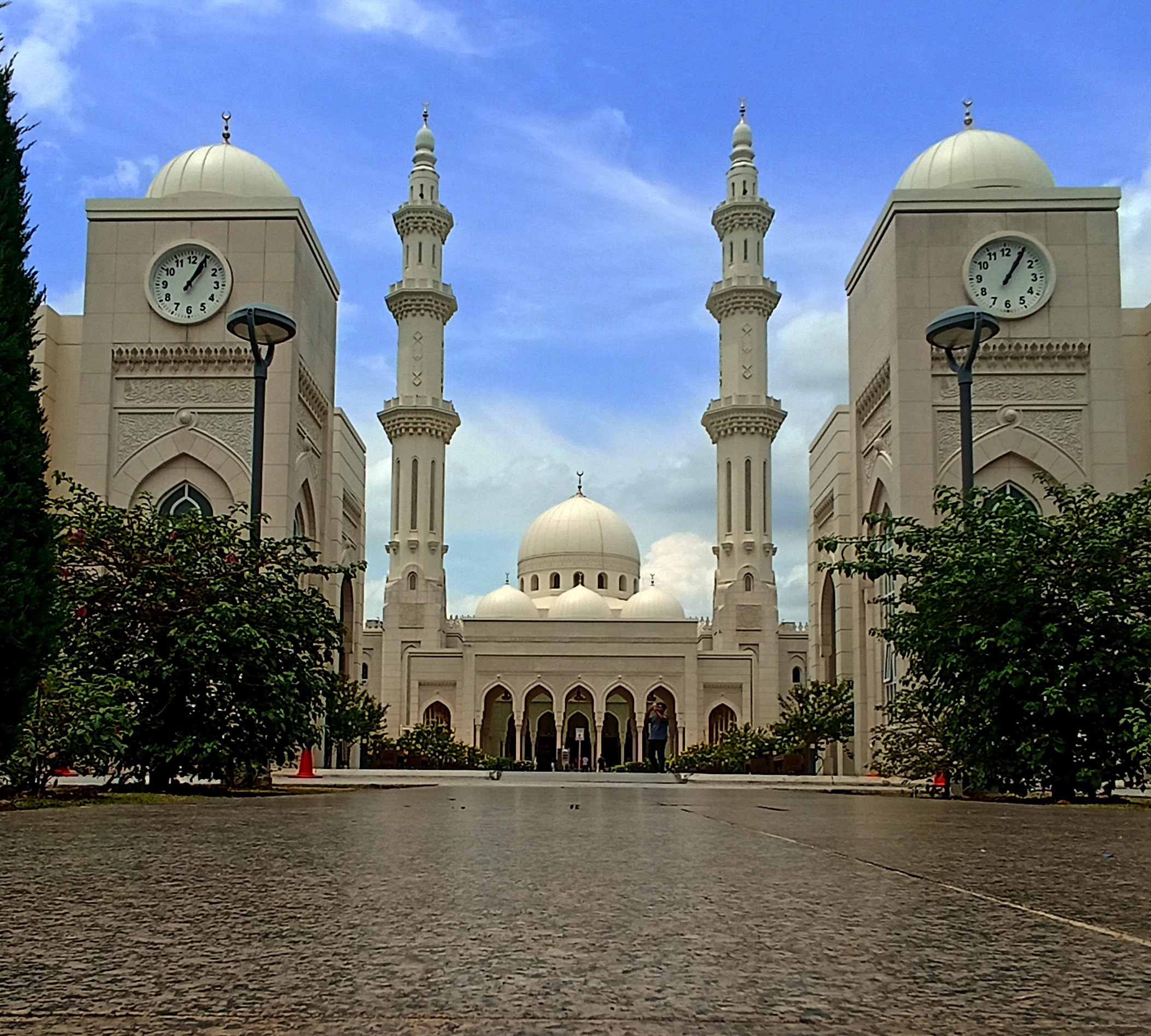
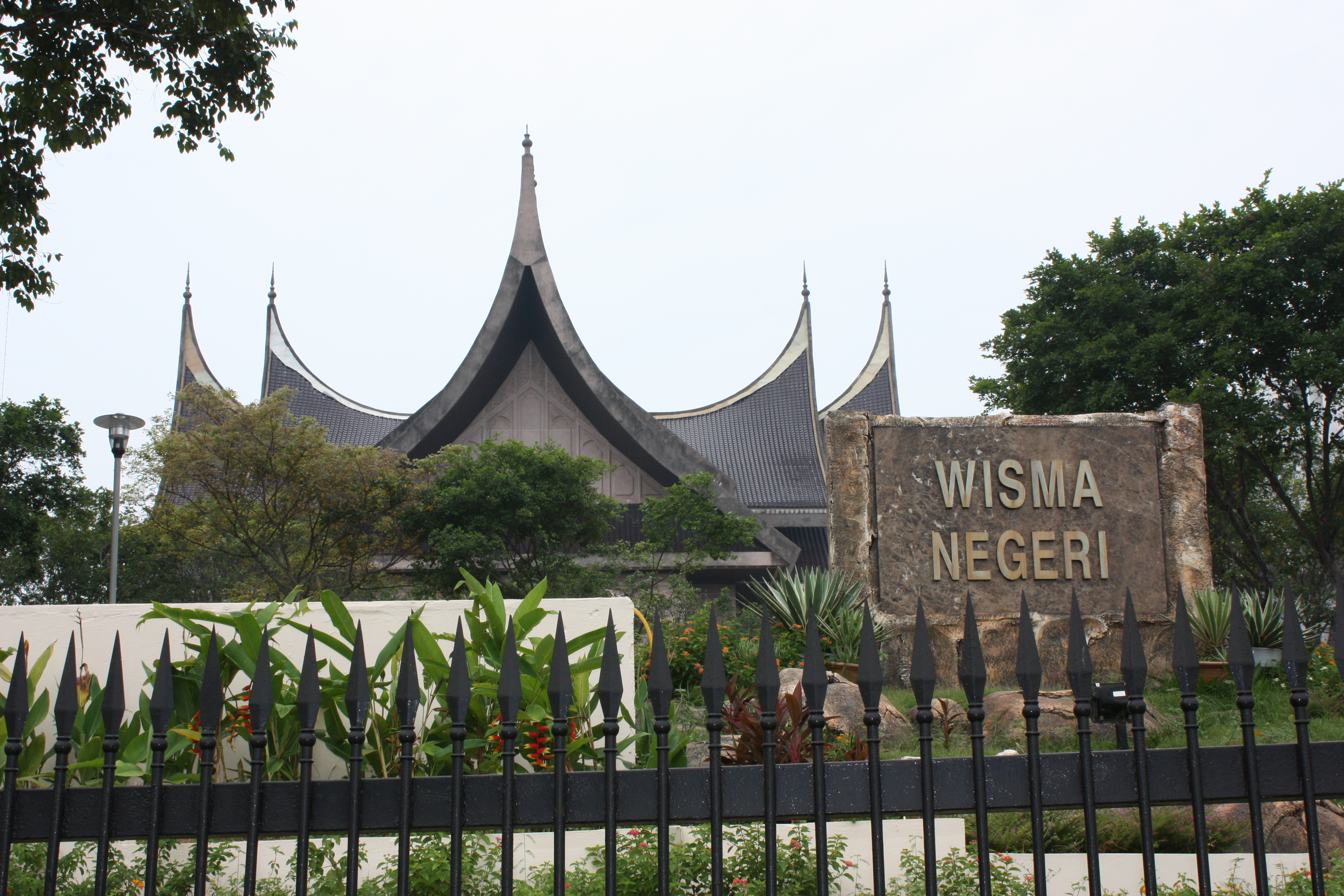
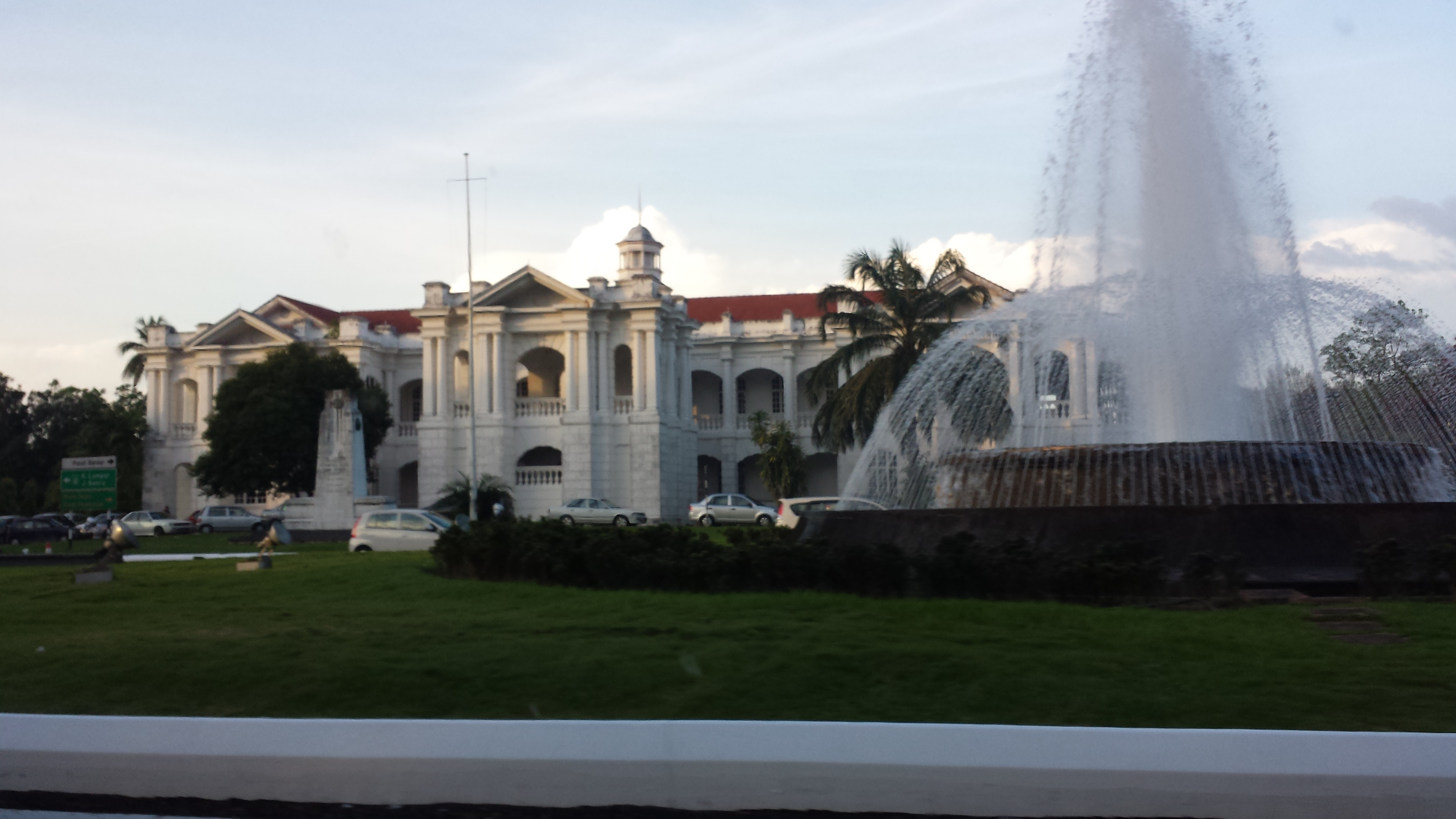
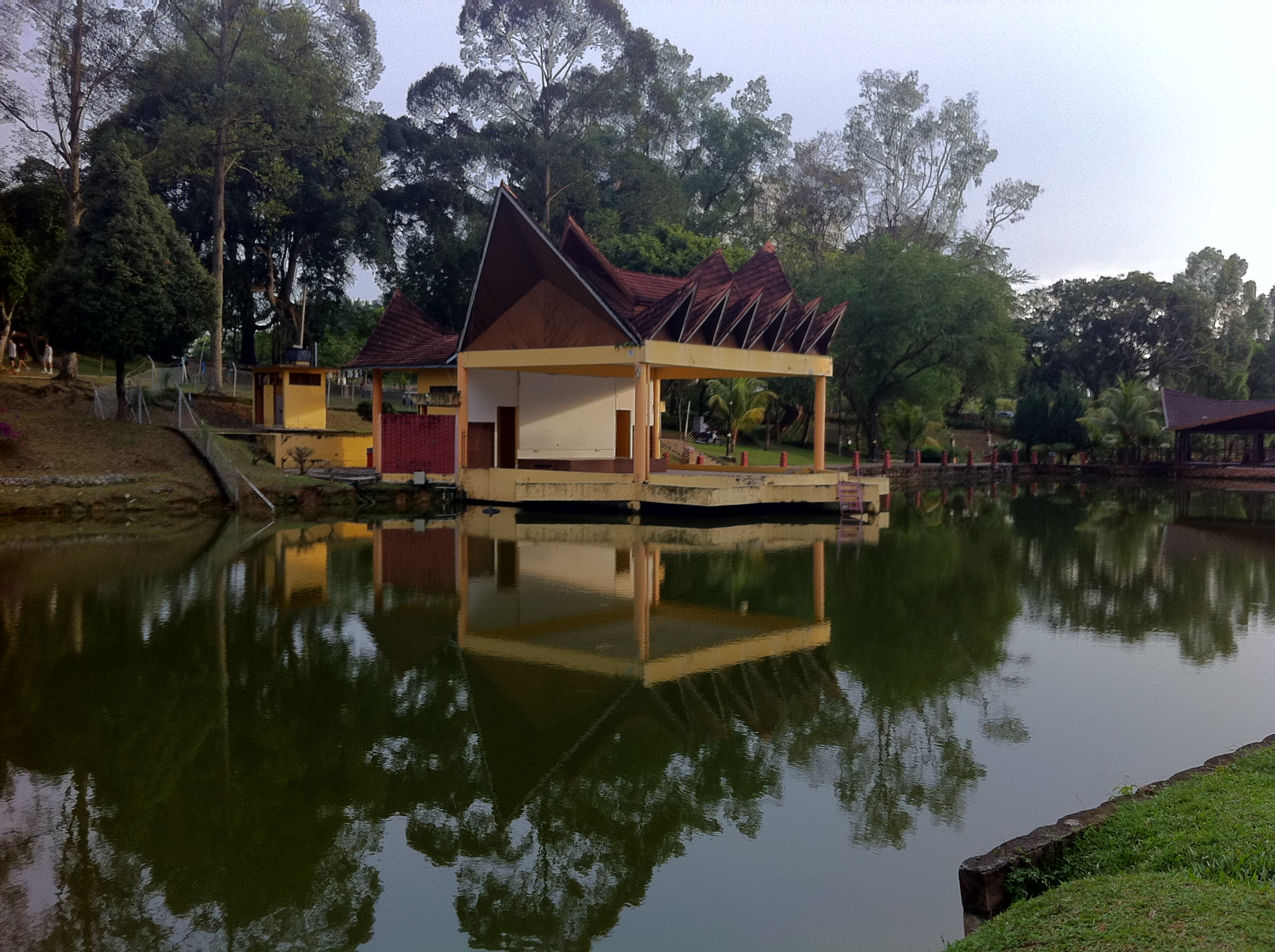
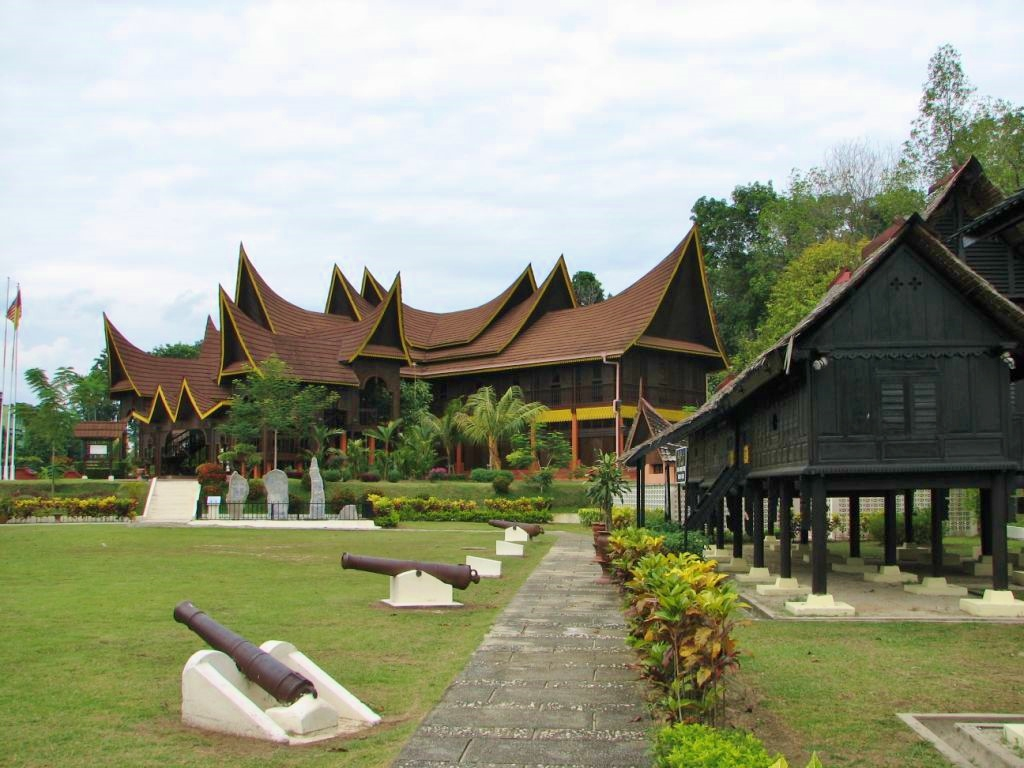
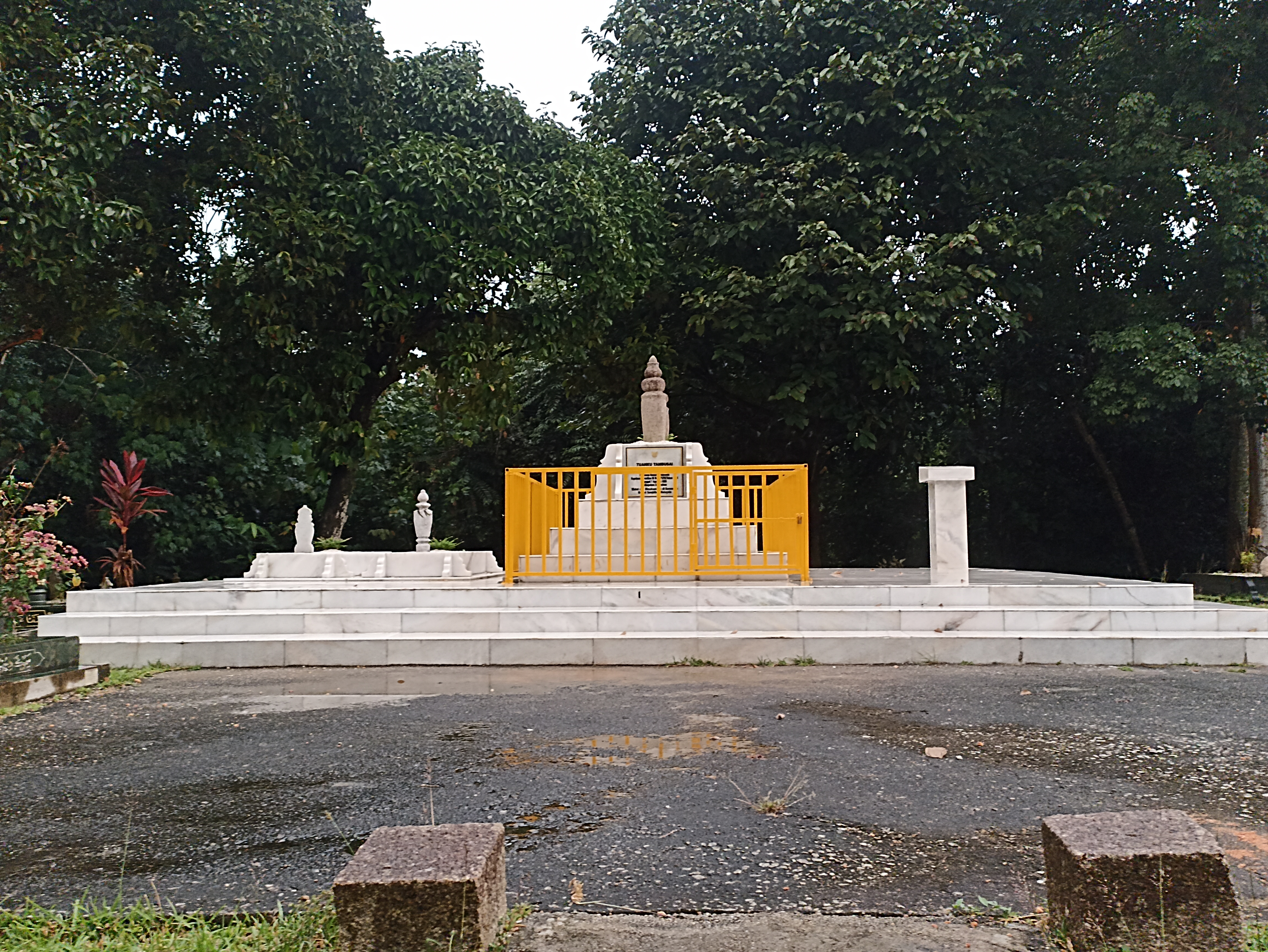
- Aerial view of the city centre Old downtown State Mosque Sri Sendayan Mosque Wisma Negeri Former State Secretariat Building Seremban Lake Gardens State Museum Tomb of Tuanku Tambusai

- Flag Seal
- Nicknames: S'ban, Bandaraya Beradat ('City of Customs')
- Motto: Mampan. Bersih. Sejahtera. (in Malay) "Sustainable. Clean. Prosperous."
- Location of Seremban in Negeri Sembilan
- Seremban in Negeri Sembilan Seremban (Peninsular Malaysia) Seremban (Malaysia) Seremban (Southeast Asia) Seremban (Asia)
- Coordinates: 02°43′20″N 101°56′30″E
- Country: Malaysia
- State: Negeri Sembilan
- District: Seremban
- Luak: Sungai Ujong
- Establishment: 1840
- Local government: 1897
- Town board: 1946
- Town council: 1953
- Municipality status: 1 March 1979
- City status: 20 January 2020; 6 years ago

Government
  - Type: City council
  - Body: Seremban City Council
  - Mayor: Masri Razali

Area
  - State capital city and district capital: 959 km^{2} (370 sq mi)
  - Metro: 2,980 km^{2} (1,150 sq mi)
- Elevation: 79 m (259 ft)

Population (2020)
  - State capital city and district capital: 681,541 (10th)
  - Density: 489.00/km^{2} (1,266.51/sq mi)
  - Metro: 824,300
  - Demonym: Serembanite
- Time zone: UTC+8 (MST)
  - Summer (DST): Not observed
- Postal code: 70000 (Downtown Seremban); 70100 (Rahang and Dusun Nyior); 70200 (Lobak); 70300 (Rasah, Mambau, Seremban 2, Seremban 3); 70400 (Ampangan, Sikamat); 70450 (Senawang); 71200 (Rantau); 71450 (Taman Tuanku Jaafar, Sungai Gadut); 71700 (Mantin); 71750 (Bandar Tasik Senangin, Kampung Sungai Jai, Broga); 71760 (Bandar Enstek); 71770 (Pantai); 71800 (Nilai); 71900 (Labu); 71950 (Bandar Sri Sendayan)
- Mean solar time: UTC + 06:46:48
- National calling code: 06
- License plate prefix: Nxx (for all vehicles include taxis)
- ISO 3166-2: MY-05
- Website: www.mbs.gov.my/en

Seremban (Negeri Sembilan Malay: Somban) is a city in the Seremban District and the capital of the state of Negeri Sembilan in Peninsular Malaysia. The city's administration is run by the Seremban City Council.

Seremban gained its city status on 20 January 2020. Covering an area of 959 km², Seremban's population is 681,541 as of 2020, making it the tenth largest city in Malaysia and the fifth most populous state capital behind Johor Bahru, Shah Alam, George Town and Ipoh. It is part of the Greater Kuala Lumpur area, situated approximately 55 kilometres south of Kuala Lumpur and 37 kilometres south of the federal administrative capital of Putrajaya. Since 2015, Seremban has been the major anchor city of the Malaysia Vision Valley, Negeri Sembilan's main special economic zone spanning the state's western half.

== Toponymy ==
Sungai Ujong
- Luak Berundang
- Luak Sungai Ujong
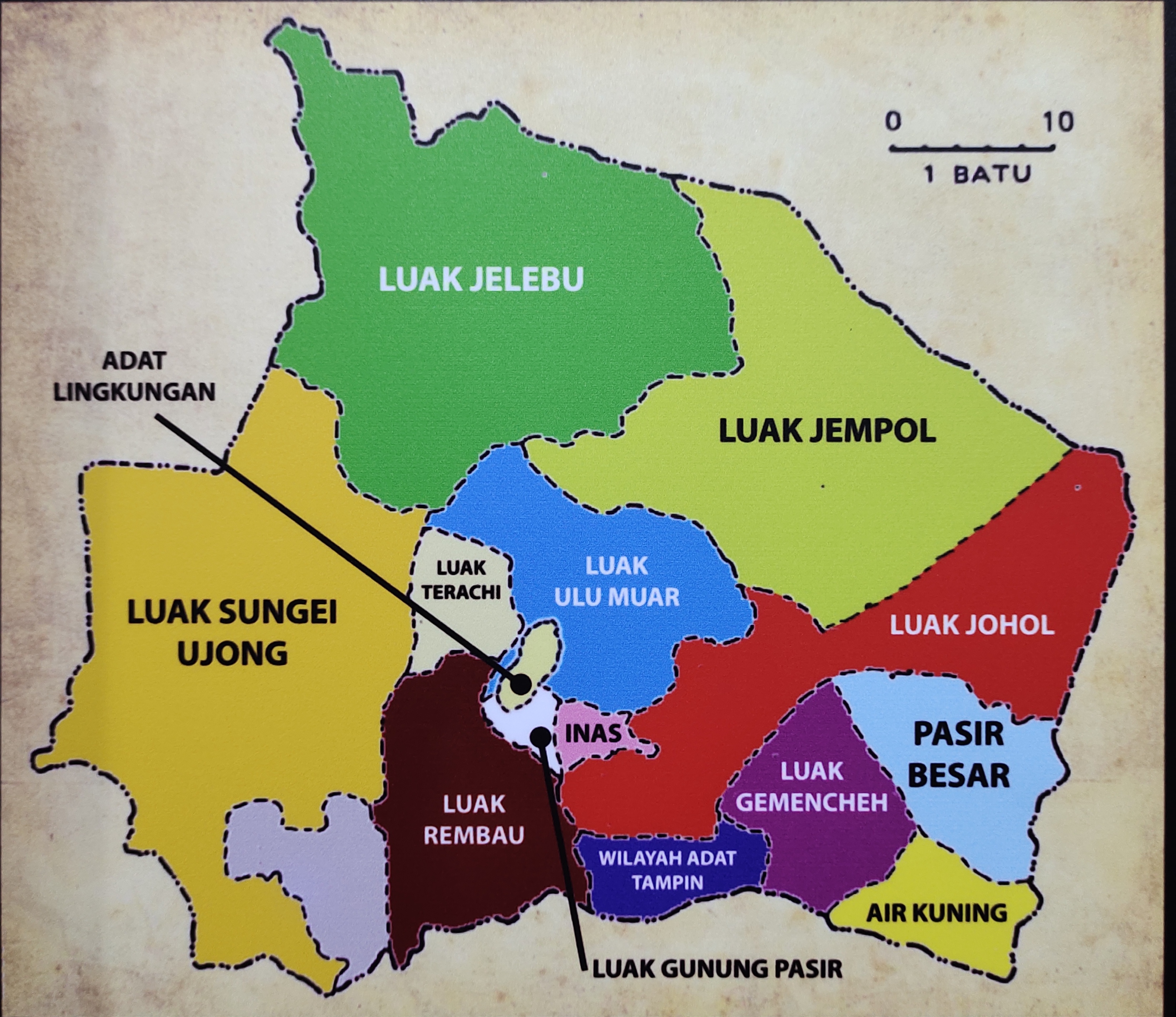
- Luak of Sungai Ujong relative to other luaks in Negeri Sembilan
- Country: Malaysia
- State: Negeri Sembilan
- Adat institution: Undang of Sungai Ujong

Government
  - Undang: Muhammad Faris Johari (disputed)
  - Dato' Shahbandar: vacant
  - Dato' Muda Linggi: Amran Mohd. Salleh

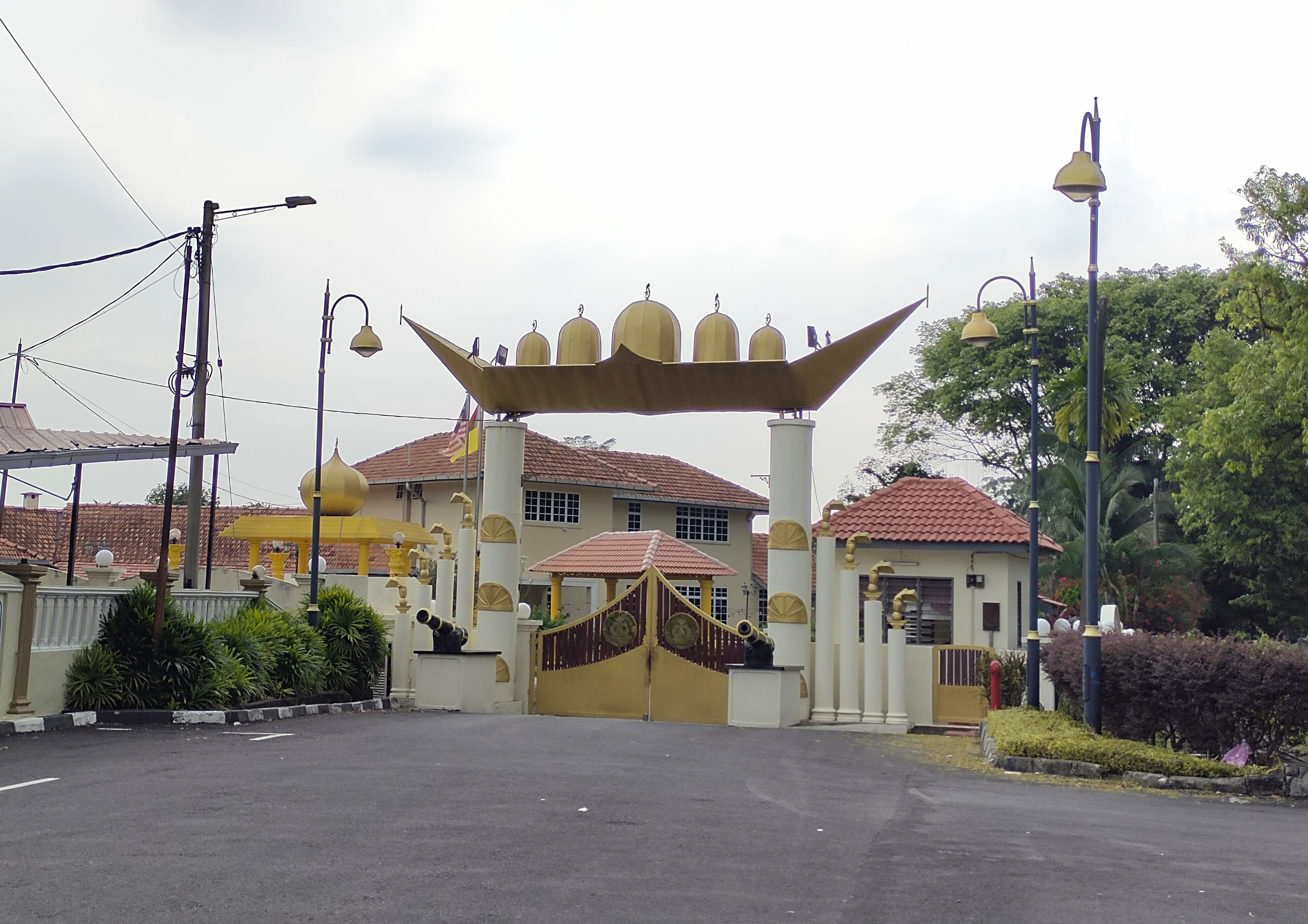
The official residence of the Undang of Sungai Ujong in Ampangan.

Seremban was founded as Sungei Ujong (or Sungai Ujong). While the town was renamed Seremban thereafter, the name Sungai Ujong most prominently persists as a street name for a road adjoining the southern side of town (Sungai Ujong Road, or Jalan Sungai Ujong). It is also the name of a luak (chiefdom) that formed Negeri Sembilan, that covers the eponymous district as well as neighbouring Port Dickson District.

Among the Chinese-speaking community, the city is known as "fùhyùhng" in Cantonese and "fúróng" in Mandarin (Chinese: 芙蓉, literally "hibiscus"), which comes from a phonetic approximation of "Ujong" (using the Cantonese reading of the characters). Another more transliterating but uncommon name was Sai-lam-ban (Chinese: 西林閩; Jyutping: Sai^{1}lam^{4}man^{5}).

== History ==
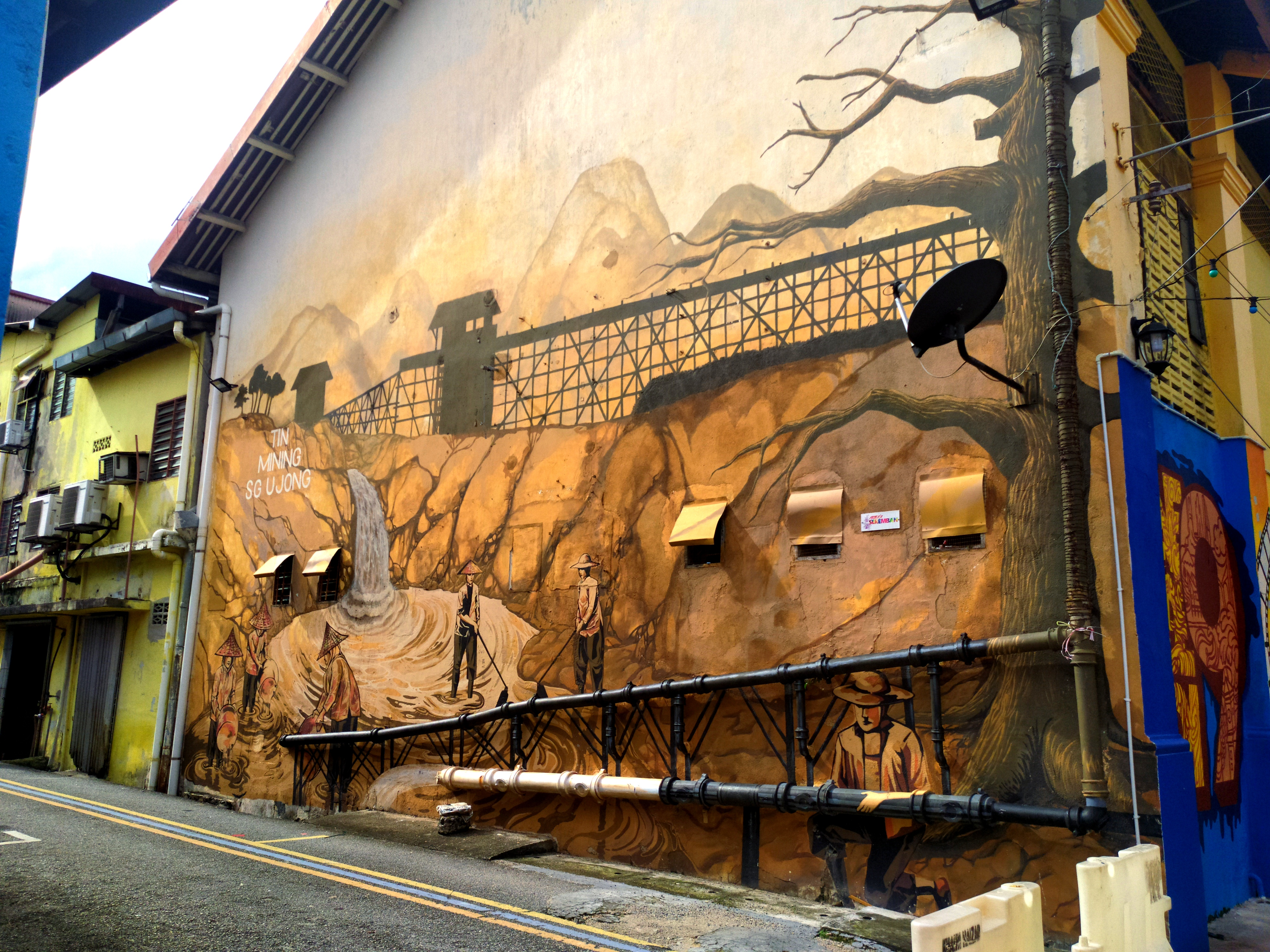
A mural in the Lorong Seni (Art Alley), reflecting the city's tin mining origins.

Sungai Ujong, also known as Sening Ujong, as it was originally known, was an ancient settlement. It has been said in the Malay Annals that King Parameswara reportedly visited Sening Ujong after fleeing the kingdom of Singapura before ultimately establishing the Malacca Sultanate. The same settlement was also referred to as Sang Hyang Ujong in Javanese accounts, notably the Nagarakretagama, as well as Suneujon in Godinho de Erédia's cartographic records, which dates back to 1613. Growth took off, as with most major towns in Peninsular Malaysia, after the discovery of tin ore in the 1870s. The discovery of tin in a nearby area called Rasah saw an influx of Arab, Malay and Chinese immigrants to work on the mines and trade there. Most of the local Malays were farmers.

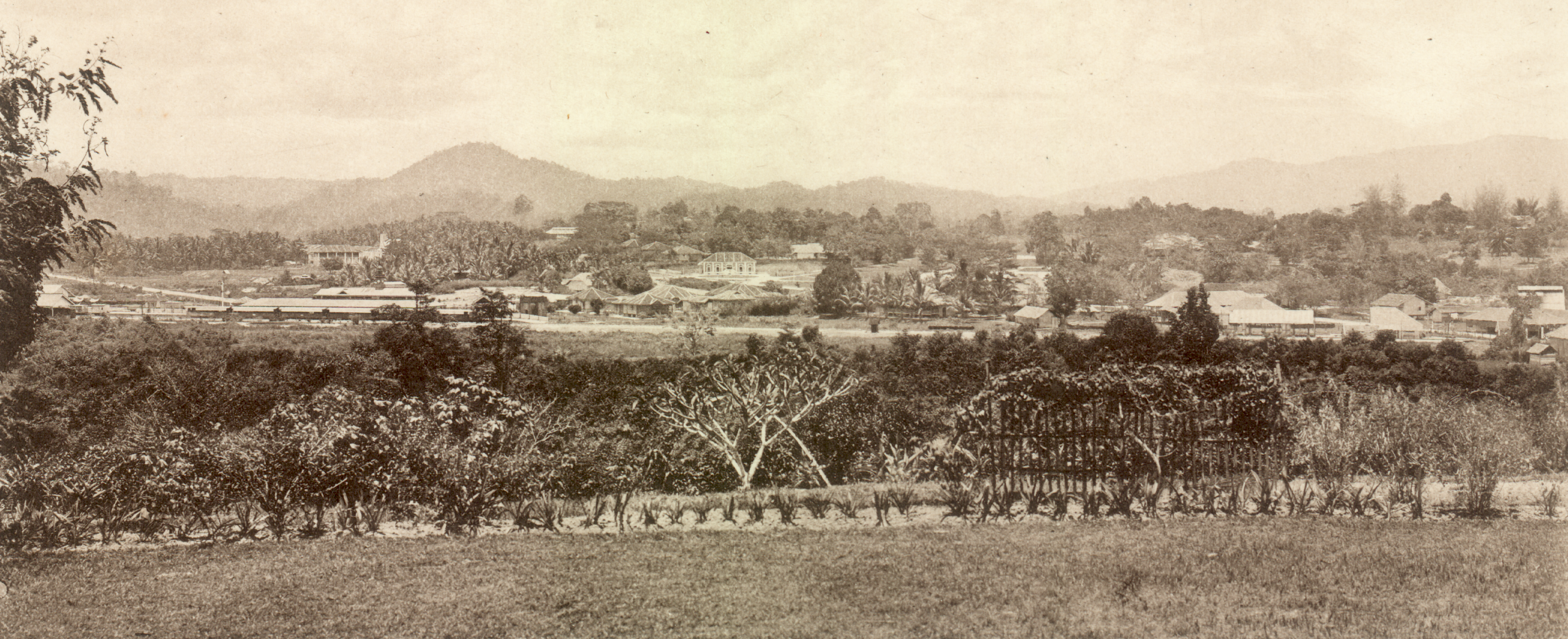
Seremban, Negeri Sembilan, Federated Malay States, circa 1910

Renamed as Seremban, the town flourished originally as a mining centre in the 1840s. The Linggi River served as the sole outlet to ferry tin and supplies in and out of the town. Revenue came not only from tin trade but also from the large amount of taxes collected, much to the displeasure of the traders and the British colonists at the neighbouring port of Malacca.

The local chieftains of the late 19th century, namely the Dato' Kelana and the Dato' Shahbandar of Sungai Ujong were at odds with each other on the rights to collect taxes and ownership and control of the mines. The rivalry to assert influence and authority opened the door for British intervention in Negeri Sembilan. The British sided with Dato' Kelana upon invitation and defeated Dato' Shahbandar's forces who was later sent into exile to Singapore. In a show of gratitude to the British for helping him win the war, Dato' Kelana had no choice but to accept a British Resident whose job was to advise him on matters other than religion and Malay customs.

Captain Patrick James Murray was appointed the first resident and later set-up his residence at Channer Road, now renamed Jalan Dato' Siamang Gagap. Soon after, the people living around Rasah moved to Channer Road for the sake of security and its orderly administration.

=== City status ===
Before 2020, Seremban was one of four state capitals that had yet to be elevated to city status (Malay: Bandar raya); the other three being Kota Bharu (Kelantan), Kuantan (Pahang) and Kangar (Perlis). To achieve city status, the state government had agreed to merge the Nilai Municipal Council and Seremban Municipal Council, with that decision being approved by the federal government in 2012.

Then Menteri Besar Datuk Seri Mohamad Hasan said during Tuanku Mukhriz's birthday:

The state government wanted to ensure all the necessary infrastructure, public transport and amenities and services which include garbage collection and safer neighbourhoods, were in place before it did so.

On 13 December 2017, then Menteri Besar of Negeri Sembilan, Mohamad Hasan stated that Seremban achieve city status in 2018. In order to get city status, both Seremban and Nilai Municipal Councils would be merged to form a new local authority, Seremban City Council. However, he said, the merging of the two entities would not involve reducing staff or higher assessment rates in the Seremban area, as increasing rates was not a prerequisite for attaining city status.

So, I hereby announce that the assessment rates in Negeri Sembilan for 2018 will not be raised

In February 2018, a further announcement was made regarding the formation of Seremban City Hall (Dewan Bandaraya Seremban), which was poised to be completed in April. However, the official declaration of Seremban as a city would only occur in January 2019, in conjunction with the birthday of the state's ruler Tuanku Muhriz (January 14). After the change in the ruling coalition after the 14th General Election ushered in a new state government, the new Mentri Besar Aminuddin Harun announced his decision to push back the official promotion towards the end of the year, citing the inability of contractors to complete refurbishment works at the new City Hall in time. However, the postponement would allow the authorities time to iron out any flaws in Seremban's infrastructure and amenities.

Two municipal administrators, Seremban Municipal Council (Majlis Perbandaran Seremban) and Nilai Municipal Council (Majlis Perbandaran Nilai) officially merged into a new administrator, Seremban City Council (Majlis Bandaraya Seremban) on 1 January 2020. On 20 January, Seremban's status as a city was officialised in a declaration ceremony.

== Geography and climate ==
Satellite view of Greater Kuala Lumpur. Seremban is situated to the lower right of the picture.

Seremban is located 30 kilometres inland from the coast. It is situated in the Linggi River valley, at the western fringes of the Titiwangsa Mountains. The terrain is generally hilly, and the soil is mostly reddish laterite soil, suitable for the cultivation of rubber and palm oil, thus making Seremban the agricultural centre for the state. Since the establishment of Seremban, the Linggi River has played an important role in the city's growth. During the boom period of tin mining, the Linggi River served as the major transportation route for tin traders. Today, it is one of the major sources of water for the Seremban metropolitan area and Negeri Sembilan.

The climate of Seremban, like most parts of Peninsular Malaysia, is generally hot and humid (tropical) with a mean temperature of about 26–30 degrees Celsius. Most of the rainfall is experienced during the inter-monsoon periods of April and October. The weather remains generally dry for the rest of the year with occasional showers.

Climate data for Seremban
| Month | Jan | Feb | Mar | Apr | May | Jun | Jul | Aug | Sep | Oct | Nov | Dec | Year |
|---|---|---|---|---|---|---|---|---|---|---|---|---|---|
| Mean daily maximum °C (°F) | 30.9 (87.6) | 31.7 (89.1) | 32.5 (90.5) | 32.2 (90.0) | 31.7 (89.1) | 31.3 (88.3) | 31.1 (88.0) | 30.9 (87.6) | 31.2 (88.2) | 31.2 (88.2) | 31.0 (87.8) | 31.0 (87.8) | 31.4 (88.5) |
| Daily mean °C (°F) | 26.6 (79.9) | 27.2 (81.0) | 27.7 (81.9) | 27.8 (82.0) | 27.5 (81.5) | 27.1 (80.8) | 26.9 (80.4) | 26.8 (80.2) | 26.9 (80.4) | 27.0 (80.6) | 26.9 (80.4) | 26.8 (80.2) | 27.1 (80.8) |
| Mean daily minimum °C (°F) | 22.3 (72.1) | 22.7 (72.9) | 22.9 (73.2) | 23.4 (74.1) | 23.4 (74.1) | 23.0 (73.4) | 22.7 (72.9) | 22.8 (73.0) | 22.7 (72.9) | 22.8 (73.0) | 22.9 (73.2) | 22.6 (72.7) | 22.9 (73.1) |
| Average precipitation mm (inches) | 114 (4.5) | 110 (4.3) | 178 (7.0) | 232 (9.1) | 180 (7.1) | 119 (4.7) | 127 (5.0) | 143 (5.6) | 158 (6.2) | 237 (9.3) | 252 (9.9) | 193 (7.6) | 2,043 (80.3) |
Source: Climate-Data.org

== Transportation ==
=== Rail and air ===
The rail connection was first constructed in the late 1890s as a stop on the Kuala Lumpur–Singapore main line, and until today, the Seremban railway station still serves as one of the major stops along the line. The station also serves as the southern terminal of the Keretapi Tanah Melayu electrified commuter network, KTM Komuter, which links the city to Kuala Lumpur and the Klang Valley on the Batu Caves–Pulau Sebang Line. From October 2015 to November 2016, the Komuter service has been extended to Gemas, though passengers used to be required to alight at Seremban and switch trains to the Gemas extension line (much akin to the Tanjung Malim–Rawang stretch). However, after 2016, all KTM Komuter trains run to Sungai Gadut or Pulau Sebang-Tampin without requiring to alight at Seremban.

Negeri Sembilan is one of the two states in Malaysia that are not accessible via air transportation (Perlis being the other state). However, the Kuala Lumpur International Airport (KLIA) is less than 30 minutes drive from Seremban, essentially making the airport closer to Seremban rather than Kuala Lumpur.

=== Road ===
Federal Route 1 is the oldest roadway that connects the towns and cities of the West Coast of Peninsular Malaysia running through Seremban. It connects Seremban with Rembau and Tampin to the south and Kajang, Selangor to the north. Seremban provides access to Kuala Klawang through Federal Route 86, Kuala Pilah to the east through Federal Route 51 and the coastal town of Port Dickson through Federal Route 53 or SPDH to the west. The North–South Expressway serves Seremban at 4 exits (Exit 217 at Bandar Ainsdale, Exit 218 at Seremban, Exit 219 at Seremban-Port Dickson and Exit 220 at Senawang). The LEKAS Highway links Kajang in Selangor to Paroi on the eastern end of Seremban. The Jalan Labu Federal Route 362 connects Seremban to Labu and Nilai and Jalan Sungai Ujong Federal Route 241 serves Seremban 2 and Bandar Sri Sendayan.

Seremban Railway Station

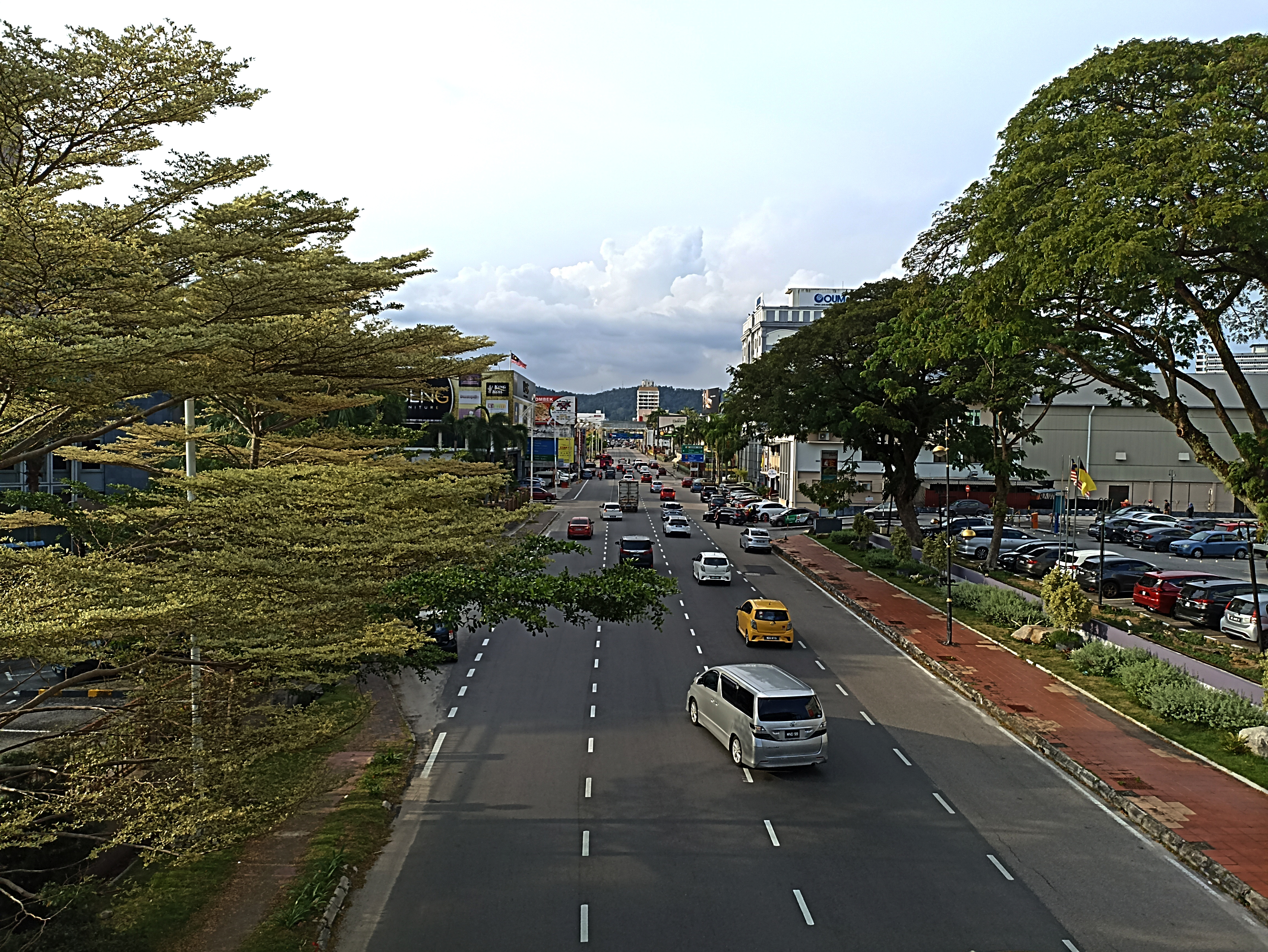
Jalan Tuanku Antah (part of Federal Route 1) is a relatively busy road in downtown Seremban

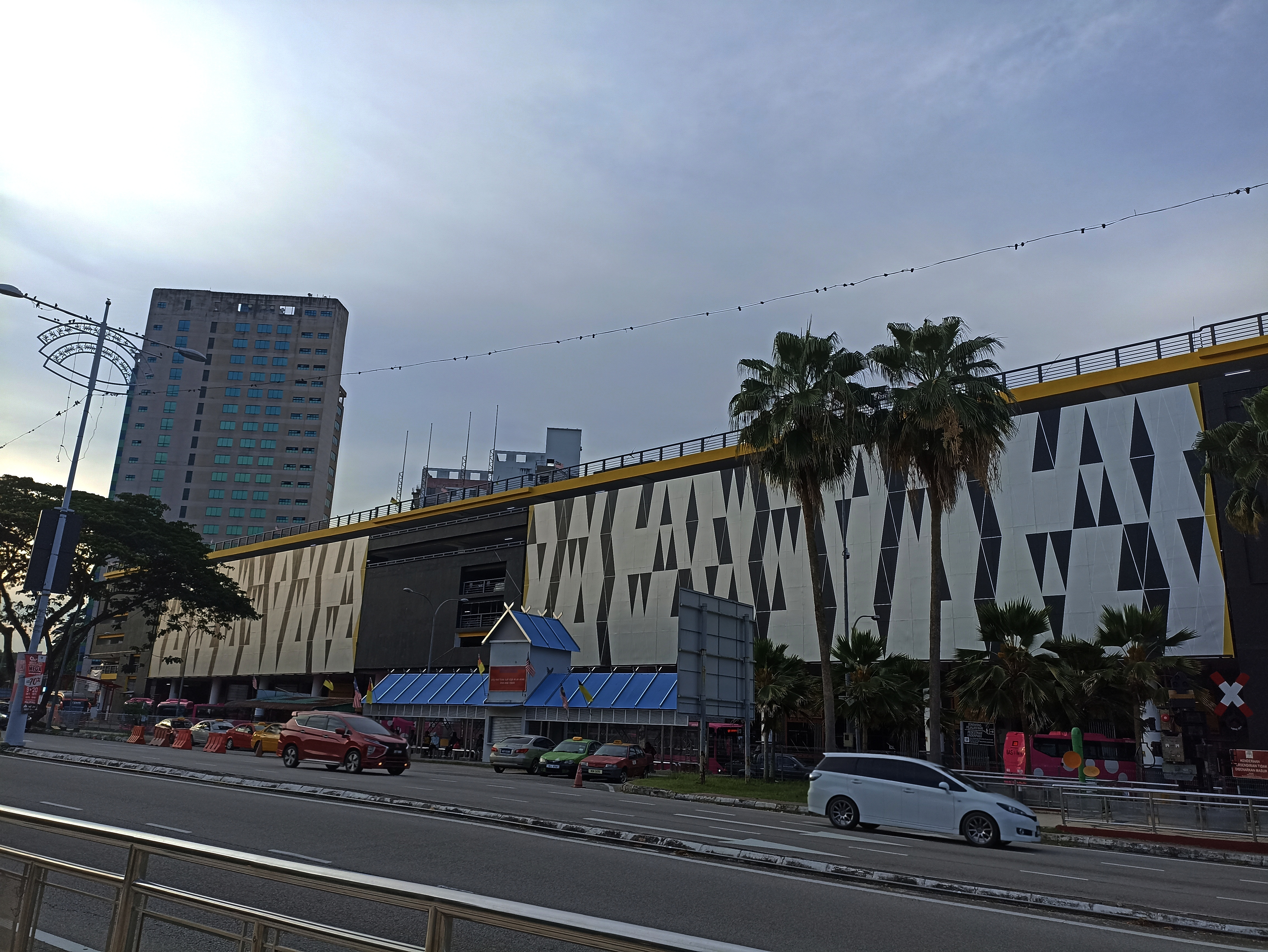
Seremban Bus Terminal, also known as Terminal One

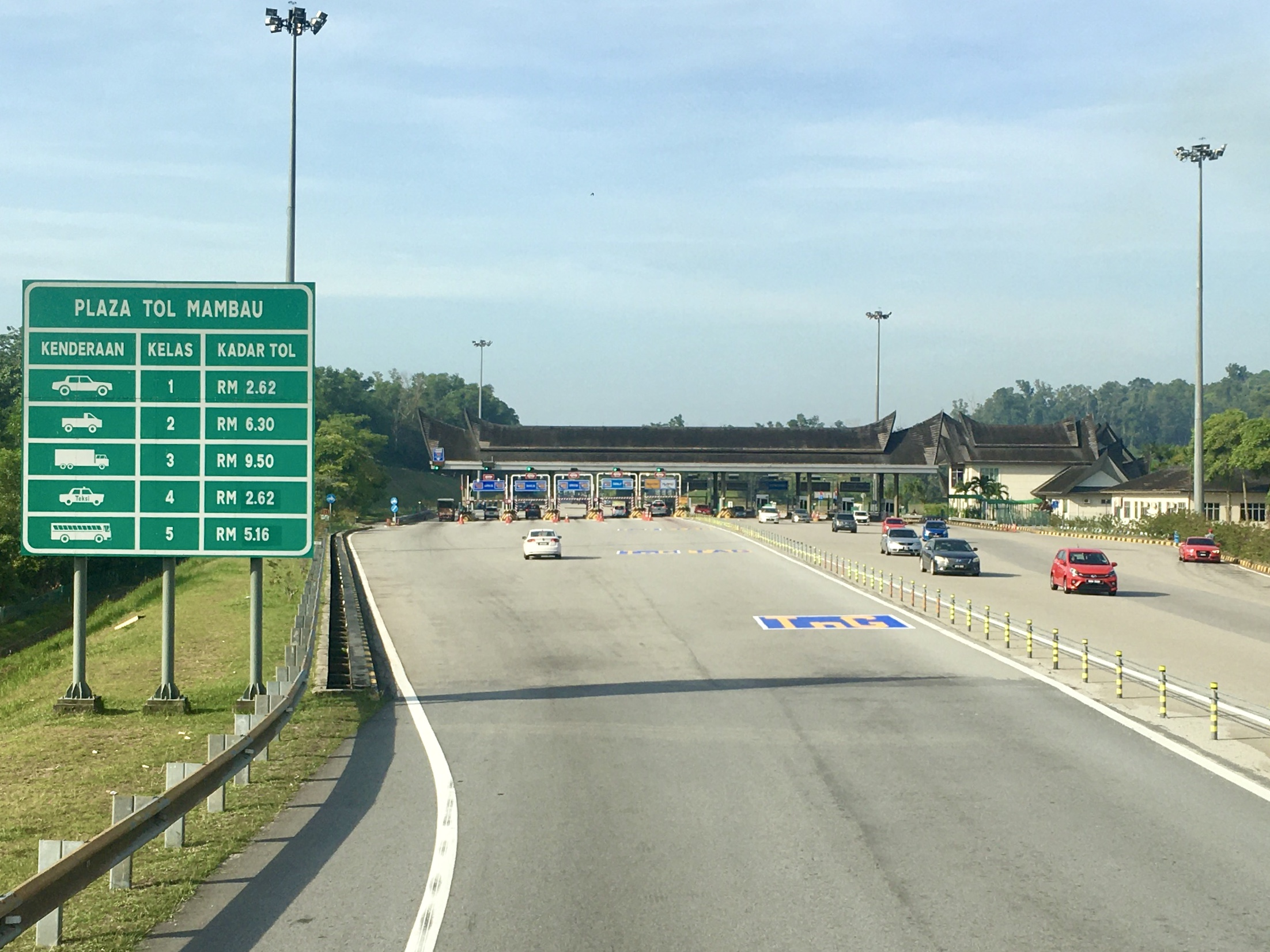
Mambau Toll Plaza, Seremban–Port Dickson Highway

== Demographics ==
According to the 2024 census, nearly 700,000 people currently reside in the administrative district of Seremban - over half of Negeri Sembilan's total population. They consist of 52.2% Bumiputera, 24.2% Chinese and 15.8% Indian and 7.8% others including non-citizens. There are an additional 31,513 non-citizens.

Ethnic groups in Seremban, 2020 census
| Ethnicity | Population | Percentage |
|---|---|---|
| Bumiputera | 290,282 | 59.2% |
| Chinese | 134,572 | 17.2% |
| Indian | 108,176 | 15.8% |
| Others | 2,392 | 0.4% |
| Non-citizens | 31,513 | 7.4% |
| Total | 566,935 | 100% |

== Culture ==
Historically, Negeri Sembilan is influenced by the Minangkabau and thus, Seremban is the centre of Minangkabau culture in Malaysia. The Minangkabau, which literally means "winning buffalo", are famous for their unique roof architecture which resembles buffalo horns. Many Seremban buildings showcase this feature, such as the City Council Hall, the Wisma Negeri and the State Museum.

People of Negeri Sembilan are also known for the practising of the matrilineal custom called Adat Perpatih (Minangkabau language: Lareh Bodi Caniago), making Negeri Sembilan the only matrilineal state in Malaysia. The majority of Malaysia's states adhere to the patrilineal Adat Temenggung.

=== Cuisine ===
Seremban is a culinary melting pot, where Malay, Chinese and Indian cuisines intermingle. The cuisine of the Negeri Sembilan Malays is heavily influenced by Minangkabau cuisine, that their traditional dishes bear semblance to those from West Sumatra. One of the local dishes is masak lemak cili api which is fish or meat cooked in coconut gravy mixed with turmeric and cili padi, touted as Negeri Sembilan's most recognizable dish nationwide.

Seremban is famous for baked crabs with many establishments situated along Jalan Tuanku Munawir (Chinese: 芙蓉烧蟹) and beef noodles (Chinese: 牛腩粉), especially those beef noodles food stalls that have survived for more than a generation. Nowadays, these beef noodles attract tourists from outside the state to Seremban with its thick, slick gravy and peppery, sticky sauce sprinkled with peanuts, salted vegetables, spring onions and sesame seeds. Yee sang (Chinese: 魚生), an elaborate raw fish salad popularly served during Chinese New Year, is said to have been originated from Seremban, owing to the city's large Cantonese populace. Siew Pau (Chinese: 芙蓉烧包), another well known Serembanite Cantonese food, is a variation of the cha siu bao, which is baked instead of steamed. The buns are filled with barbecued meat, traditionally pork, and sometimes chicken as a halal alternative.

Local desserts include air batu campur, which is shaved ice with brown sugar syrup and rose flavouring, corn, beans; and cendol. To date, the cendol in Seremban is touted to be better than renowned Teochew cendol of Penang.

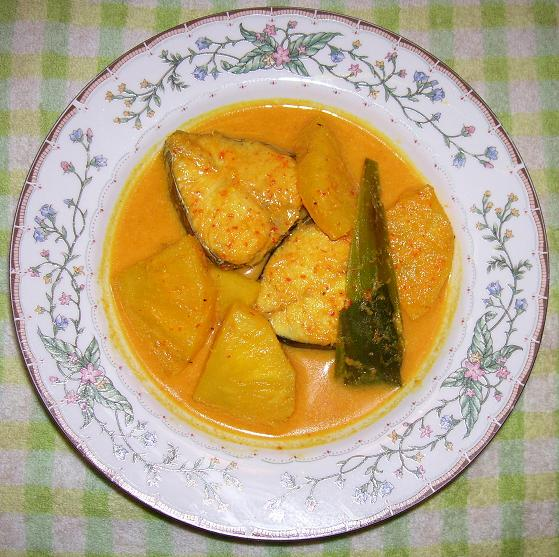
Masak lemak cili api, Negeri Sembilan's well known signature dish

Seremban Beef Noodles

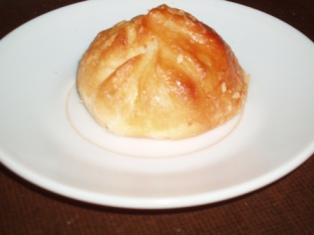
Seremban siew pau

=== Sports ===
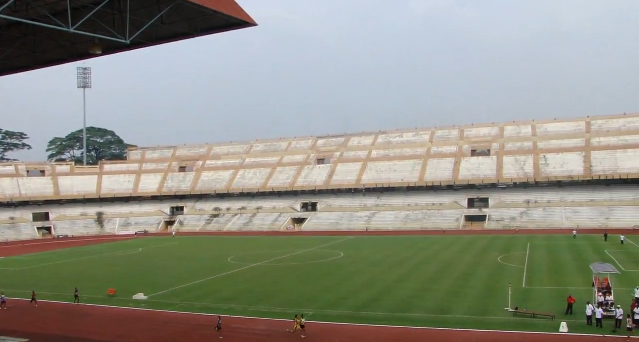
Tuanku Abdul Rahman Stadium

Seremban currently serves as the home ground of Negeri Sembilan FC football team. The team is the state representative of Negeri Sembilan in the first tier Malaysia Super League. They play their home games in the 45,000 capacity Tuanku Abdul Rahman Stadium which is located in Paroi on the eastern outskirt of the city.

=== Tourism ===
Seremban Square

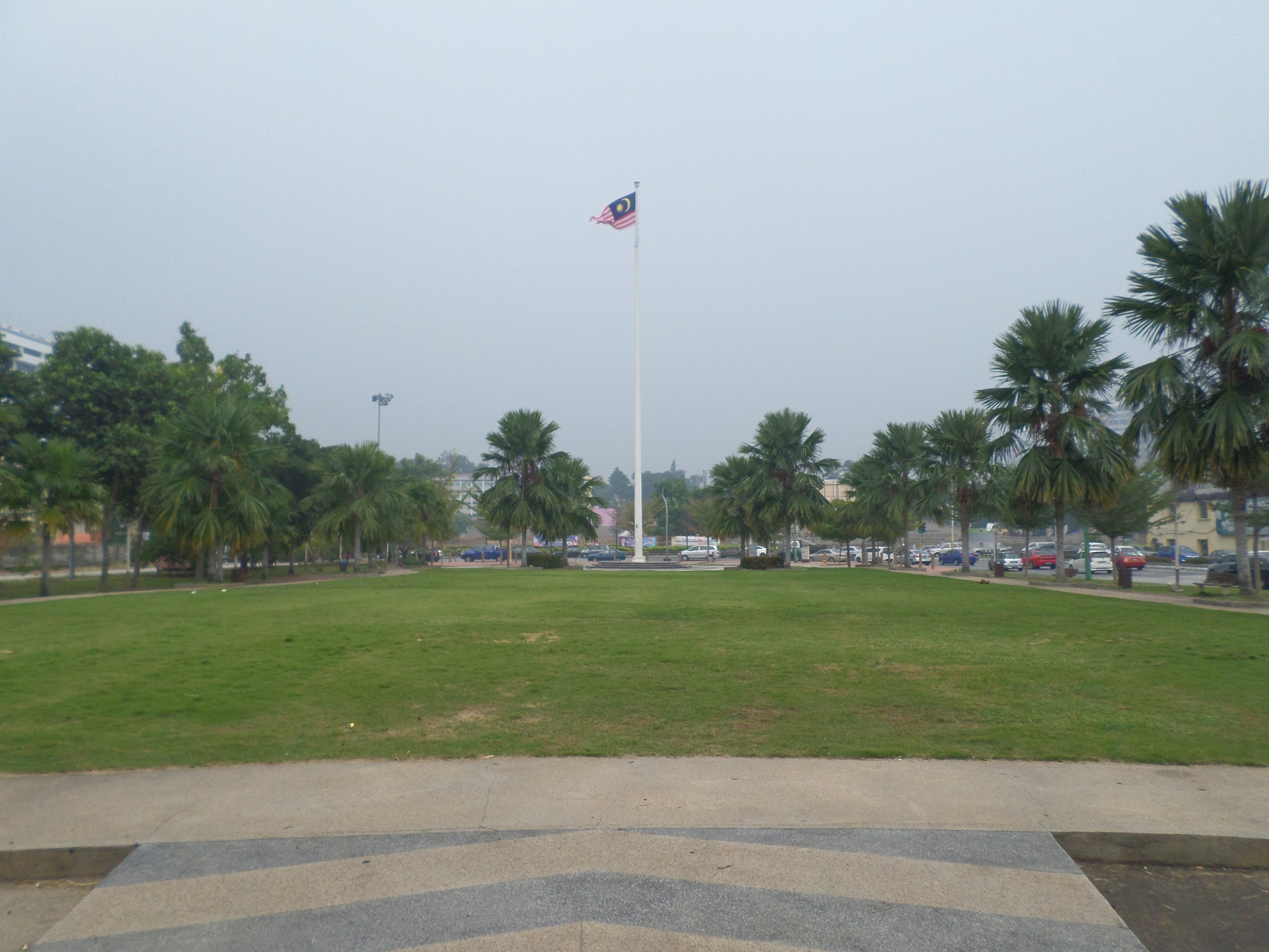
Seremban Square, downtown

Dubbed the fish pond, the name given to an area of open land in downtown Seremban area which has long been the synonym and subject of complaints of the city community has recently been given a new look. No more is there a barren, neglected view which was claimed to be the breeding ground for mosquitoes in the heart of Seremban city centre.

Recently, the Seremban Square (Malay: Dataran Seremban), which decorates the main entrance to the Seremban city, began to attract attention and has since turned into a tourist spot. In the Seremban Square area, the Malaysian flag is raised on a flagpole standing 100 ft high.

The Seremban Municipal Councils hoped that the Seremban Square, which began its operation in May 2008, would be appreciated and used properly. It was hoped that it would continue to be used by all walks of life, not just for the present but would continue to be a valuable heritage for the future generation.

Ostrich Farm

The Jelita Ostrich Show Farm in Jalan Jelebu is a popular destination centred on all facets of the ostrich rather than simply breeding activities.

State Museum

The Negeri Sembilan Museum was established in 1953 when the 8th Yamtuan or Ruler of Negeri Sembilan, Tuanku Abdul Rahman gave his consent for the relocation of the Ampang Tinggi Palace from Kuala Pilah to the Taman Bunga at Jalan Dato' Hamzah, Seremban and was turned into the State Museum.

Seremban Lake Garden

Seremban Lake Garden is a recreational and leisure centre in Seremban which attracts many visitors, especially during public holidays and weekends. This Lake Garden is one of the oldest natural lake gardens in Malaysia.

Seremban 2 Recreational Park

Seremban 2 recreational park is a popular destination for leisure activities, particularly for families.

Malaysia Park

Malaysia Park is in line with the government's noble intention in ensuring that each town is modernised and parallel towards town greenery. the Seremban Municipal Council has identified Malaysia Park as one of the Public Parks that may be developed to accommodate the recreational and leisure and tourism needs for Seremban town.

Church of The Visitation

The Church of The Visitation is the oldest parish in the Roman Catholic Archdiocese of Kuala Lumpur since 1848. The church is located in Seremban town's centre with a sprawling 2 acres that include the historical Parochial House, Visitation Hall and Formation Centres, and the Wisma Visitation. Its neo-Gothic architecture is a central landmark of the town.

Centipede Temple

Perched on top of a hill in Ulu Temiang, Seremban lies the Centipede Temple (or Then Sze Temple). Centipedes roamed freely in and out of the temple grounds, and it is believed that if one spots a centipede, they can expect some good fortune.

== City areas ==
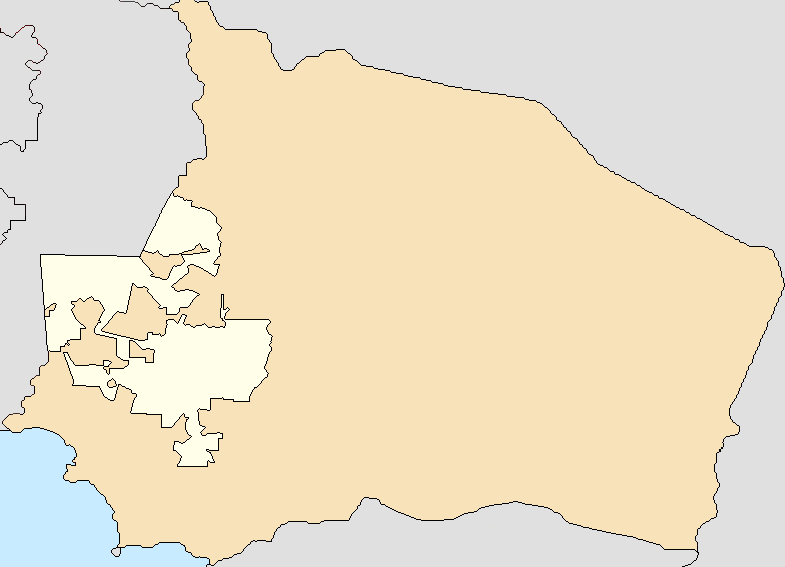
Locations of Seremban and its suburbs

=== Inner Seremban (Seremban city core) ===
- Seremban
- Rasah
- Rasah Jaya
- Rahang
- Mambau
- Senawang
- Temiang
- Lobak
- Paroi
- Bukit Chedang
- Bukit Blossom
- Seremban 2
- Rasah Kemayan
- Ampangan
- Oakland
- Bukit Kepayang
- Kemayan
- Sikamat
- Seremban 3
- Taman Permai

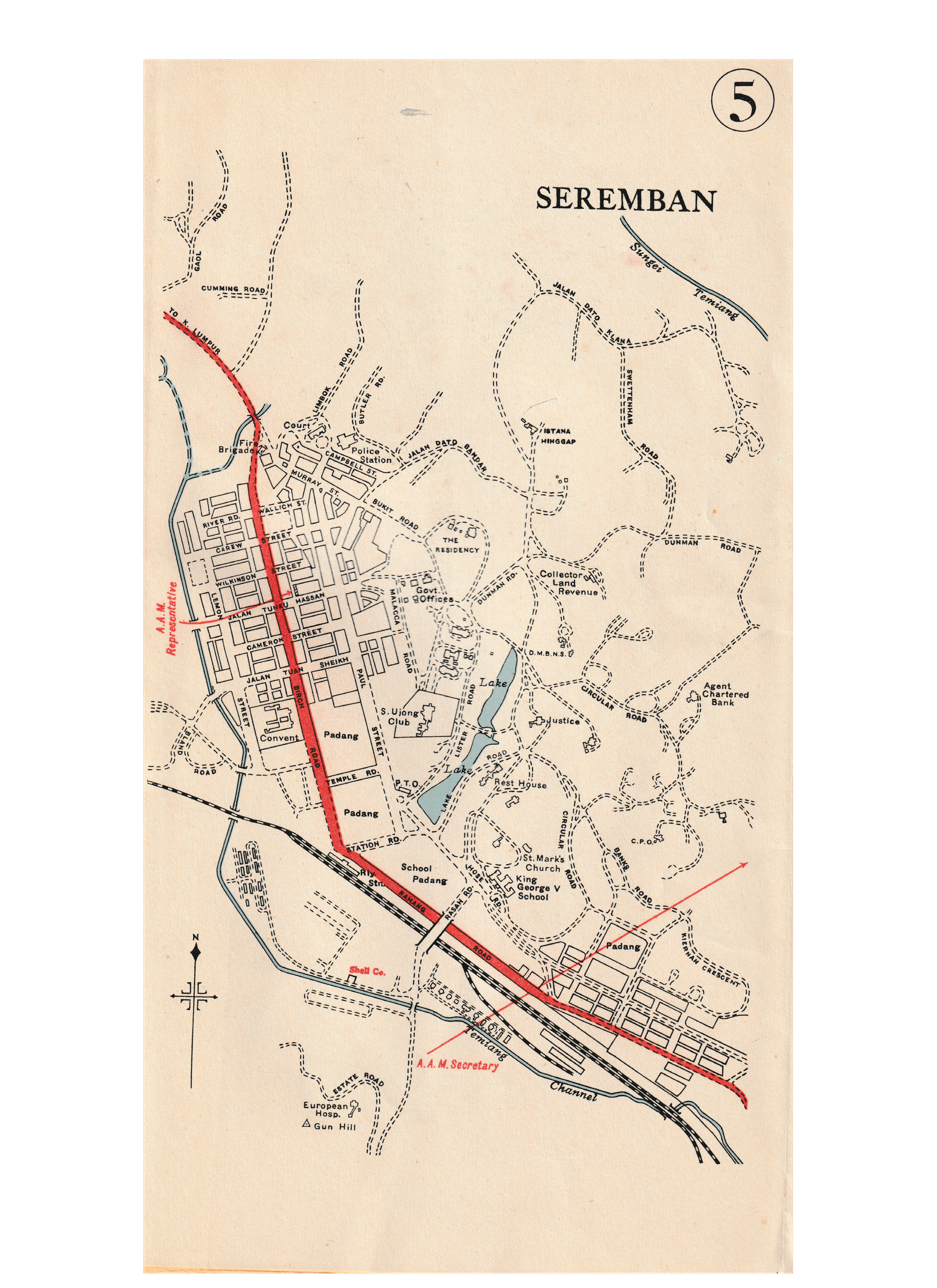
Map of Seremban in 1951

=== Outer Seremban ===
- Nilai
- Bandar Baru Nilai
- Rantau
- Mantin
- Sungai Gadut
- Labu
- Lenggeng
- Taman Seremban Jaya
- Bandar Seremban Selatan
- Taman Tuanku Jaafar
- Seremban 2 Heights
- Bandar Sri Sendayan
- Bandar Ainsdale
- Gadong Jaya
- Bandar Enstek
- Pantai
- Ulu Beranang
- Pajam

=== Seremban 2 ===
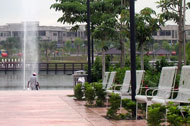
Seremban 2 City Park

Seremban 2 is a new satellite township about 4 kilometres south-east of the existing old Seremban town centre. Located on the western side of the North–South Expressway, Seremban 2 is a planned township built on former oil palm estate land to relocate the administrative and business district from the crowded old town centre to a more organised area.

Spanning over 2,000 acres (8 km^{2}) of land, Seremban 2 will be the site of the new

- Seremban District administrative offices
- Seremban Court Complex.
- District Police headquarters
- State Fire and Rescue Station headquarters

The RM2 billion township will also sustain a large portion of the population of Seremban through various housing estate projects in and around Seremban 2 such as

- Green Street Homes
- Sri Carcosa
- Central Park
- Emerald Park
- Garden Homes
- Garden Avenue
- Garden City Homes
- Vision Homes
- S2 Heights
- Park Avenue
- Pearl 132

Facilities include ÆON Seremban 2 Shopping Centre, City Park, Seremban 2's Lake Gardens.

== Economy ==
Jalan Dato' Lee Fong Yee

Since its early days, being an administrative centre has helped cement Seremban's place as Negeri Sembilan's primate city. The state has been home to several multinationals from Japan, South Korea, the United States and the European Union. The manufacturing sector today forms the backbone of the state economy, contributing almost half of the state's gross domestic product (GDP), followed by services and tourism (40.3%), agriculture (6%), construction (2.2%) and mining (0.3%). In addition, Seremban's proximity to the economically prosperous Klang Valley region has led to the city's inclusion into the Malaysia Vision Valley, an economic development corridor jointly initiated by both the Federal and state governments in 2015 to leverage on the positive spillover effect of the Klang Valley into Negeri Sembilan. Since then, it has drastically propel the city's urbanisation and economic growth, with new industrial areas and townships are currently being developed around the city's outskirts.

=== Retail ===
Seremban is the business and commercial centre for most towns and villages in Negeri Sembilan. During the weekends, residents from outlying areas come to Seremban by commuter train or buses to shop in Seremban. Amway opened their first concept shop in Seremban in August 2008 as an ongoing expansion strategy to give its distributors and customers a new shopping experience.

Terminal One Shopping Centre is located at the heart of Seremban. It was built in 1996.

AEON Seremban 2, one of the premier shopping destinations in the city, was the only ÆON outlet operated in the state until February 2010, when ÆON launched their grand opening of ÆON Big at Seremban Forest Heights that replaced the old Carrefour. The latter was then refurbished to house the newly formed Seremban City Council, following the merger of two separate municipal authorities of Seremban and Nilai Municipal Councils.

Besides T1 and AEON, many shopping outlets are concentrated in the city centre; Wisma Punca Emas, KM Plaza, The Store, Palm Mall, Era Square and Parkson Seremban Prima which replaced Seremban Parade. In addition, several new malls were also opened in Nilai, such as AEON Nilai and MesaMall. As the population increased over time, it attracted five major hypermarket chains in Malaysia to set up outlets in Seremban, namely Giant Hypermarket, Lotus's, Econsave and Mydin (2 outlets).

Apart from shopping complexes, Seremban contains many neighbouring commercial districts including Taman AST, Era Square, Permai Avenue, Oakland, Kemayan Square and others.

Seremban also has designated numerous zones in the city to market locally manufactured products such as antiques, textiles, fabrics and handicrafts. The local municipal council has gazetted Jalan Utam Singh as a morning flea market during the weekend. In 2009, Sungai Ujong Walk located in Jalan Dr. Murugesu was opened by the local council president. The walk follows the example of the well known Jonker Walk in Malacca City, providing 72 business sites with 30 lots selling foodstuffs and beverages. The rest of the space serves as a stage for performances and cultural shows. It is envisioned as a future location that will revive the atmosphere at night besides enlivening the surrounding areas.

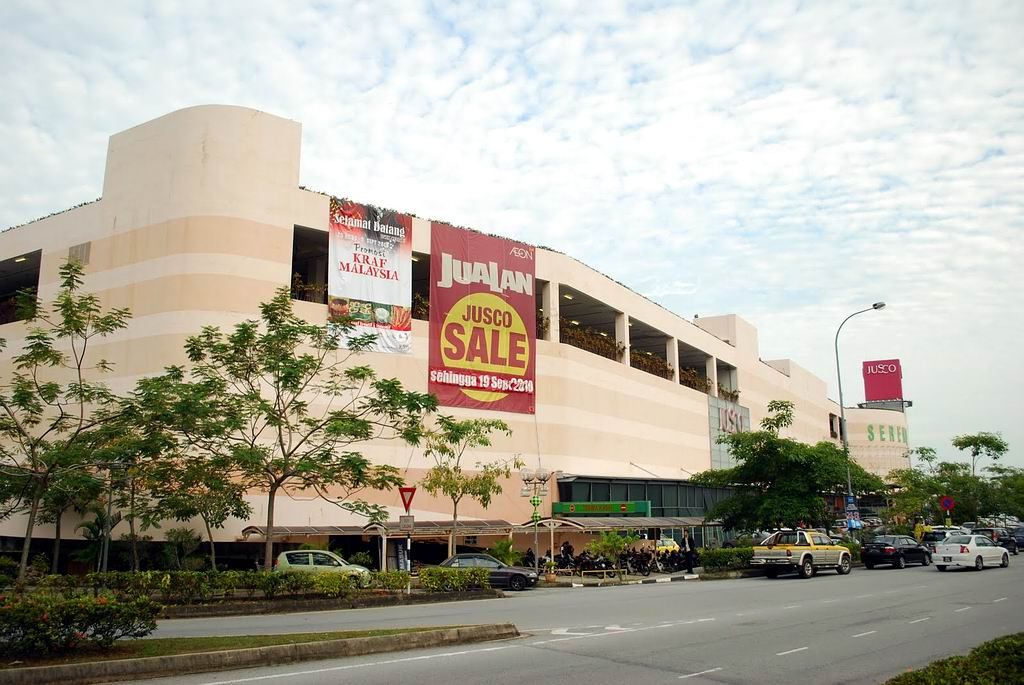
AEON Jusco Seremban 2

The Store Seremban

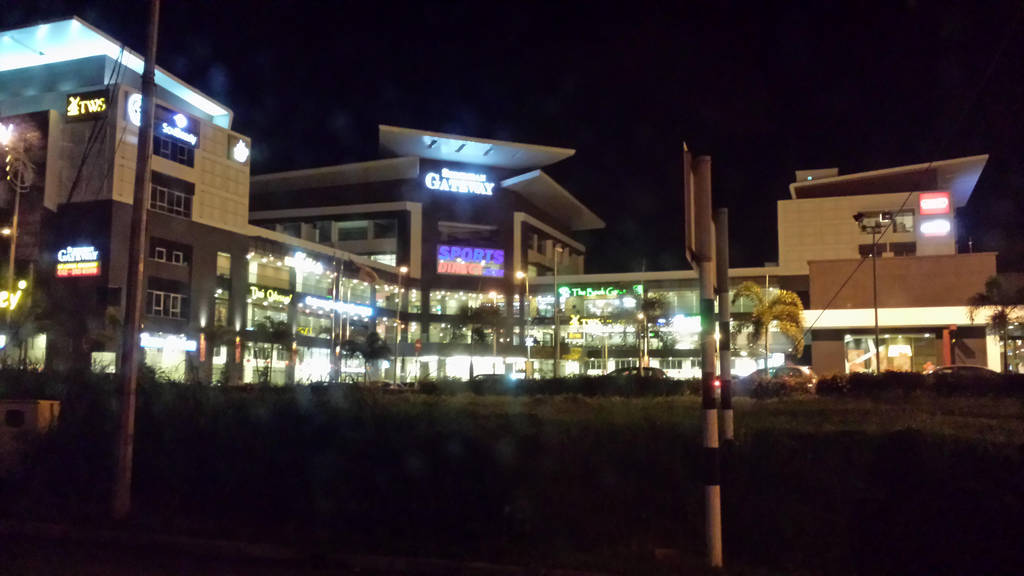
Seremban Gateway

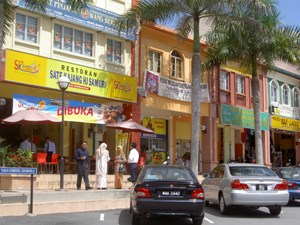
Senawang Commercial Centre, a.k.a. the Taipan of Senawang

Sungei Ujong Walk

== Healthcare ==
Seremban has many hospitals and medical centres, which include a government hospital and private-owned hospitals.

Tuanku Ja'afar Hospital, formerly known as Seremban General Hospital is the state and referral hospital for the state of Negeri Sembilan. Established in 1930 with a total capacity of 800 beds and 20 clinical specialities and various supportive services. Situated at Bukit Rasah, Seremban, the hospital occupying an area of 212 acres (0.86 km^{2}) of land.

The other hospitals include Columbia Asia Medical Center, which opened in 1999 and now has 80 beds and offers outpatient and inpatient specialist services, a 24-hour clinic and emergency services.

In 2004 a new hospital was established, Seremban Specialist Hospital, which has a total capacity of 109 beds. The hospital located at the outskirt of Seremban, which is just behind the State Museum.

Negeri Sembilan Chinese Maternity Hospital is also a private hospital that has 75 beds. It located along Jalan Tun Ismail.

There is also a hospital in Senawang, the 101 beds Senawang Specialist Hospital (SSH) opened in 2008.

== Politics ==
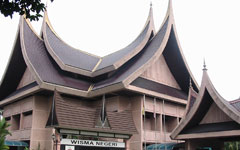
Wisma Negeri, showing its distinctive Minangkabau curved roof, resembling buffalo horns.

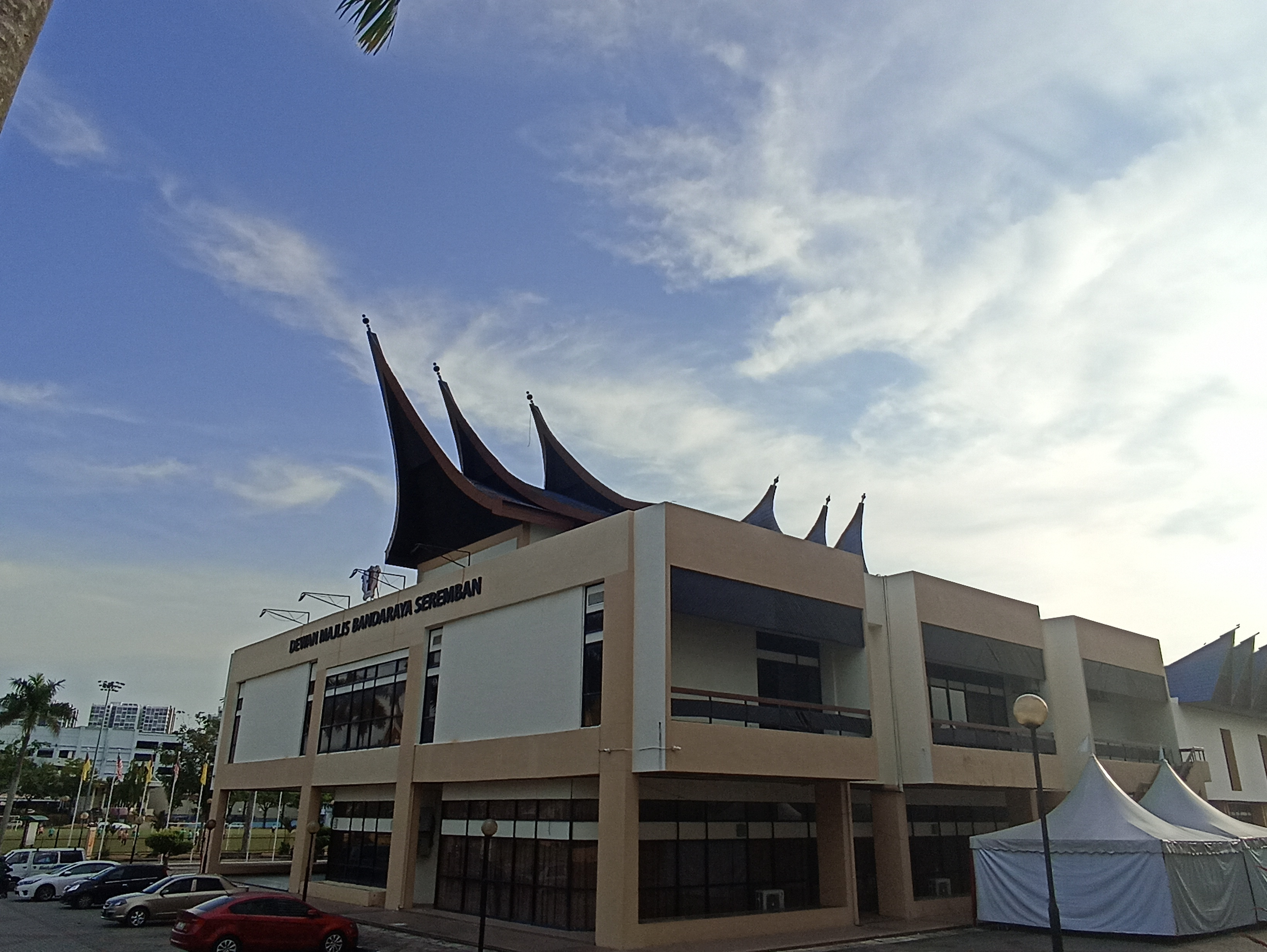
City Council Hall

Seremban is currently represented in the Dewan Rakyat of the Malaysian Parliament by three federal constituencies. Inner Seremban are located under Seremban while other small part of Seremban are Rasah (Seremban 2 dan Senawang) and Rembau (Paroi). Anthony Loke Siew Fook from Pakatan Harapan (DAP) are represent of Seremban while two others represents by Cha Kee Chin also from DAP and Mohamad Hasan from Barisan Nasional (UMNO).

On the state level, Seremban supplies 6 seats to the Negeri Sembilan State Legislative Assembly:

- Lenggeng;
- Nilai;
- Lobak;
- Temiang;
- Sikamat; and
- Ampangan.

Currently the DAP controls three out of these six seats: Nilai, Lobak and Temiang; Perikatan Nasional through WAWASAN and PAS holds Sikamat and Ampangan while Lenggeng is currently held by Barisan Nasional.

Certain wards of Seremban, though administered by the Seremban City Council, are actually located in other parliamentary constituencies; for instance, Paroi is represented by Rembau constituency, while Mambau, Bukit Kepayang, Rahang and Seremban Jaya are located within the borders of Rasah parliamentary constituency. All of them represent yg DAP except Paroi are represent by Perikatan Nasional (PAS).

== Notable people ==
- Aidil Zafuan, a footballer.
- Ambiga Sreenevasan, lawyer and human rights advocate.
- Anthony Loke Siew Fook, Secretary-General of the Democratic Action Party (DAP).
- Chen Man Hin, founding member of the DAP and former MP of Seremban.
- Freddy Vias, former hockey player.
- Julian Leow Beng Kim, archbishop of the Archdiocese of Kuala Lumpur.
- Lawrence van Huizen, former hockey player.
- Gary Fidelis, former hockey player.
- Mazlan Othman, an astrophysicist.
- Nabil Ahmad, a comedian.
- Peter van Huizen, former hockey player.
- Sinnayah Sabapathy, former track and field athlete.
- Siti Nordiana, a singer and an actress.
- Tuanku Tambusai (1784–1882), Muslim cleric known for his involvement in the Padri War, a National Hero of Indonesia.
- Yong Nyuk Lin, former minister of Singapore.
- Zaquan Adha, a footballer.

== Twinning ==
- Bukittinggi, Indonesia.
- Izumi, Japan.
