= Rantau =

Coordinates: 2°35′13.8″N 101°57′45.1″E

- Mukim and Suburb of Seremban
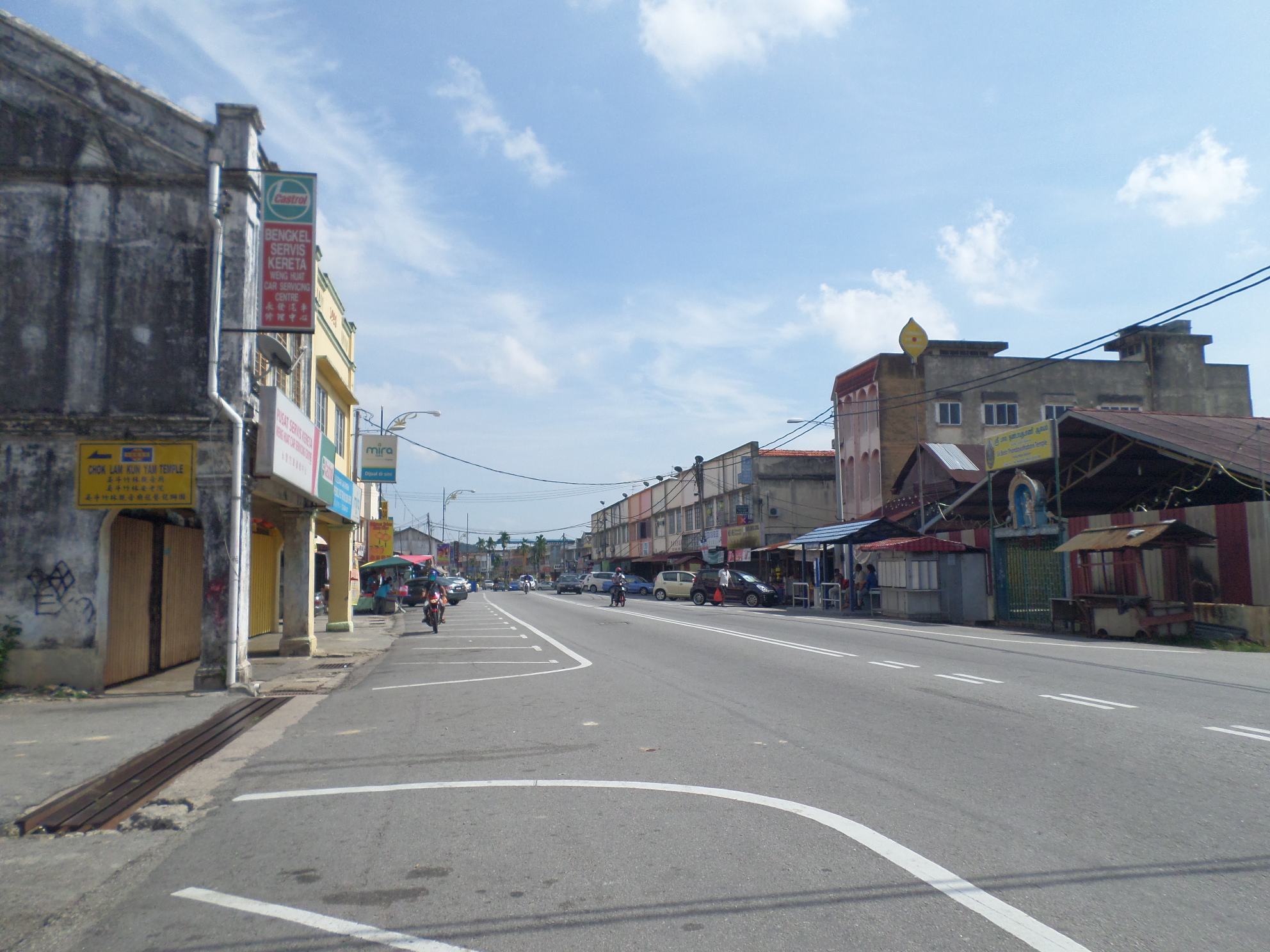
- Negeri Sembilan State Route N7 passing through Rantau, bound for Linggi.
- Interactive map of Rantau
- Country: Malaysia
- State: Negeri Sembilan
- District: Seremban
- Luak: Sungai Ujong

Rantau (Chinese: 晏斗) is a small town and a mukim in Seremban District, Negeri Sembilan, Malaysia.

== Location ==
Rantau is 16 km south of downtown Seremban, 20 km northeast of Port Dickson and 49 km southeast of Kajang, Selangor.

It is surrounded by several hamlets including Kuala Sawah, Siliau, Pedas and Ayer Kuning, and is the main town in the region with facilities like banks, mini market, quick-service restaurants and a post office.

== Society ==
The community contains five primary schools and two secondary schools. Rantau supports a multiracial population of around 8,000 people. Former Menteri Besar, Mohamad Hasan is Rantau's representative in the State Assembly since 2004.

Rantau has many notable successful people. Among them are the former Chief Minister of Negeri Sembilan, Dato' Seri Utama Mohamad Hasan and Maha Sinnathamby, the Rantau-born Australian developer of Greater Springfield Development in Queensland, the largest master-planned community in Australia.

== Transport ==
The town is basically located at a 4 road junction. Heading northbound is the Jalan Rantau-Mambau N7 which connects Rantau to Mambau northward and Linggi southward. Heading northeast is the N5 which connects the town to Sungai Gadut and Senawang. Heading east is the N102 which goes towards Pedas and Rembau. Finally heading west is the Jalan Rantau-Siliau N6 which connects the Rantau to Siliau and Lukut at the Federal Route 53. Although the town isn't served directly by the North-South Expressway, the closest exit is the EXIT 223 Pedas. While Rantau isn't served by the KTM Komuter, it is a few kilometers away from Sungai Gadut station.

== Nearby ==
The mosque in the nearby hamlet of Kuala Sawah was built by estate owner Bujai Bin Dato' Raja Matshah on a piece of land donated (waqf) by him in 1922 at the junction of Jalan Ulu Sawah. Bujai Bin Dato' Raja Matshah lived near the mosque till his death in 1924 and was buried in front of it.
