= Pengkalan Kempas =

Pengkalan Kempas Pongkalan Kompeh
- Hamlet

Other transcription(s)
  - Jawi: ڤڠكالن كمڤاس
  - Chinese: 船头
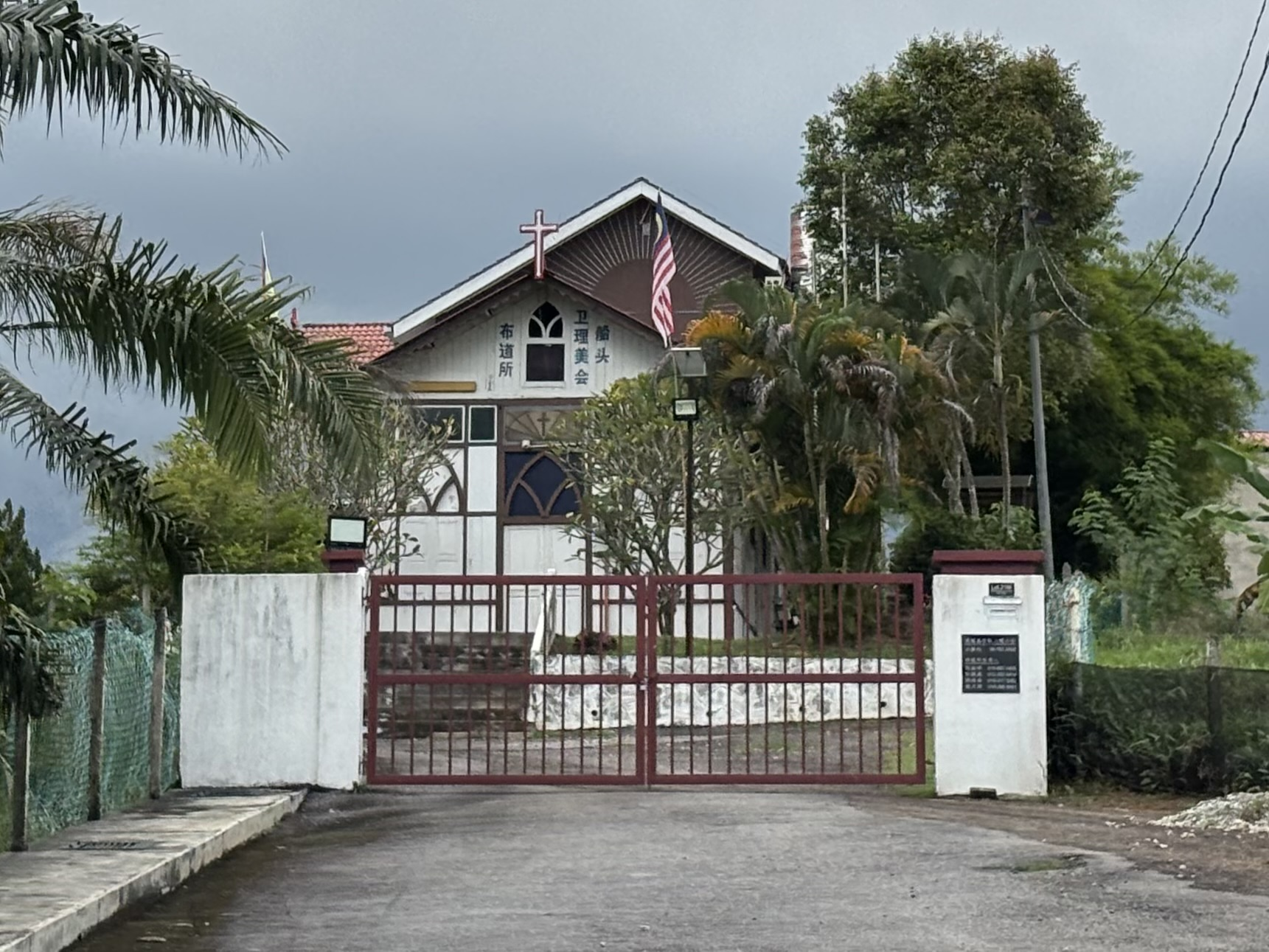
- Chinese Methodist Church in Pengkalan Kempas, Negeri Sembilan

- Location of Pengkalan Kempas Pengkalan Kempas (Peninsular Malaysia) Pengkalan Kempas (Malaysia)
- Coordinates: 2°26′55″N 102°01′02″E
- Country: Malaysia
- State: Negeri Sembilan
- District: Port Dickson
- Luak: Linggi
- Elevation: 20 m (66 ft)
- Time zone: UTC+8 (MYT)
- Postal code: 71150

Pengkalan Kempas (Negeri Sembilan Malay: Pongkalan Kompeh) is a small town in the Linggi mukim of Port Dickson District, Negeri Sembilan, Malaysia. Its small population is ethnically mixed, including a large Hakka Chinese component.

Once a significant trade port along the Linggi River, attempts to revitalise the town are based around encouraging tourism. The town is a site for recreational tourism for the fishing of giant freshwater prawns, and the Pengkalan Kempas Historical Complex has been created as a museum for megaliths.

== Location ==
Pengkalan Kempas (sometimes spelt Pengkalan Kampas) is located 35 kilometres (22 mi) from the main city of Port Dickson and around 40 kilometres (25 mi) from the state capital of Seremban, and 60 kilometres (37 mi) from Malacca City. It lies on the Linggi River.

== History ==
The name "Pengkalan Kempas" translates to "Kempas landing place", and may reflect a period in the past where the Linggi River met the sea further inland compared to its present position. Along with Lukut, Pengkalan Kempas is one of the oldest settlements in the area. While historically important, the town today is much less known.

During the 14th century, the town was an important trade port, and an important location for the area's Chinese community.

In a 1901 census, the town was recorded as having a total population of 306 people, consisting of 126 Chinese agricultural workers, 87 Malays, 2 Indians, and 91 others. At this time, it was recorded as one of the two towns of the Coast district of Negeri Sembilan, along with Port Dickson. As of 1919, much of the natural forest in the area had been replaced by rubber plantations, mostly run by ethnic Chinese and Malays.

== Administration ==
Pengkalan Kempas is in the southeast of the Linggi mukim of the Port Dickson District

Pengkalan Kempas lies within the Linggi mukim of the Port Dickson District.

== Demographics ==
The town has historically had a population including Malays, Chinese, and Indians. Some of the Chinese community are Hakka.

== Economy ==
The town is a popular spot for giant freshwater prawn fishing, which has been the main source of tourism for more than 35 years. Fishing takes place from the town's jetty, or in rented boats. This is an especially popular activity on weekends, when the town attracts perhaps 1,000 people. Around 100 boats are available for rent. For local fishermen, the catch can sell for up to RM 100 per kilogram, especially near occasions such as Chinese New Year. There are some concerns around poisoning affecting prawn populations, which may be due to activities upstream.

The government of Negeri Sembilan is promoting the town as a tourist destination, based on historical sites such as the Pengkalan Kempas Historical Complex, and wildlife such as crocodiles and fireflies. The town is a potential stop for river cruises, however the current jetty is poorly maintained and is unable to accommodate this demand. Construction of a new jetty was slated to begin in December 2024. This will cost around RM 50,000. The jetty revitalisation is part of a wider effort to enhance the town as a tourist destination. Old buildings within the town have been repainted towards this aim.

== Wildlife ==
In addition to the commonly fished giant freshwater prawns, native species in the river include native catfish, archerfish, bronze featherback, Channa, pufferfish, sea bass, Indo-Pacific tarpon, and Scatophagus argus. Introduced fish present include tilapia, Java barb, and iridescent shark catfish.

== Buildings ==
A shrine to Na Tuk Kong in the town fuses Chinese, Malay, and Indian influences, containing clay figures from various religions, including the presence of Hanuman as a guard, and the inclusion of koranic verses. This was created by locals in the remains of a derelict rubber plantation warehouse.

=== Pengkalan Kempas Historical Complex ===
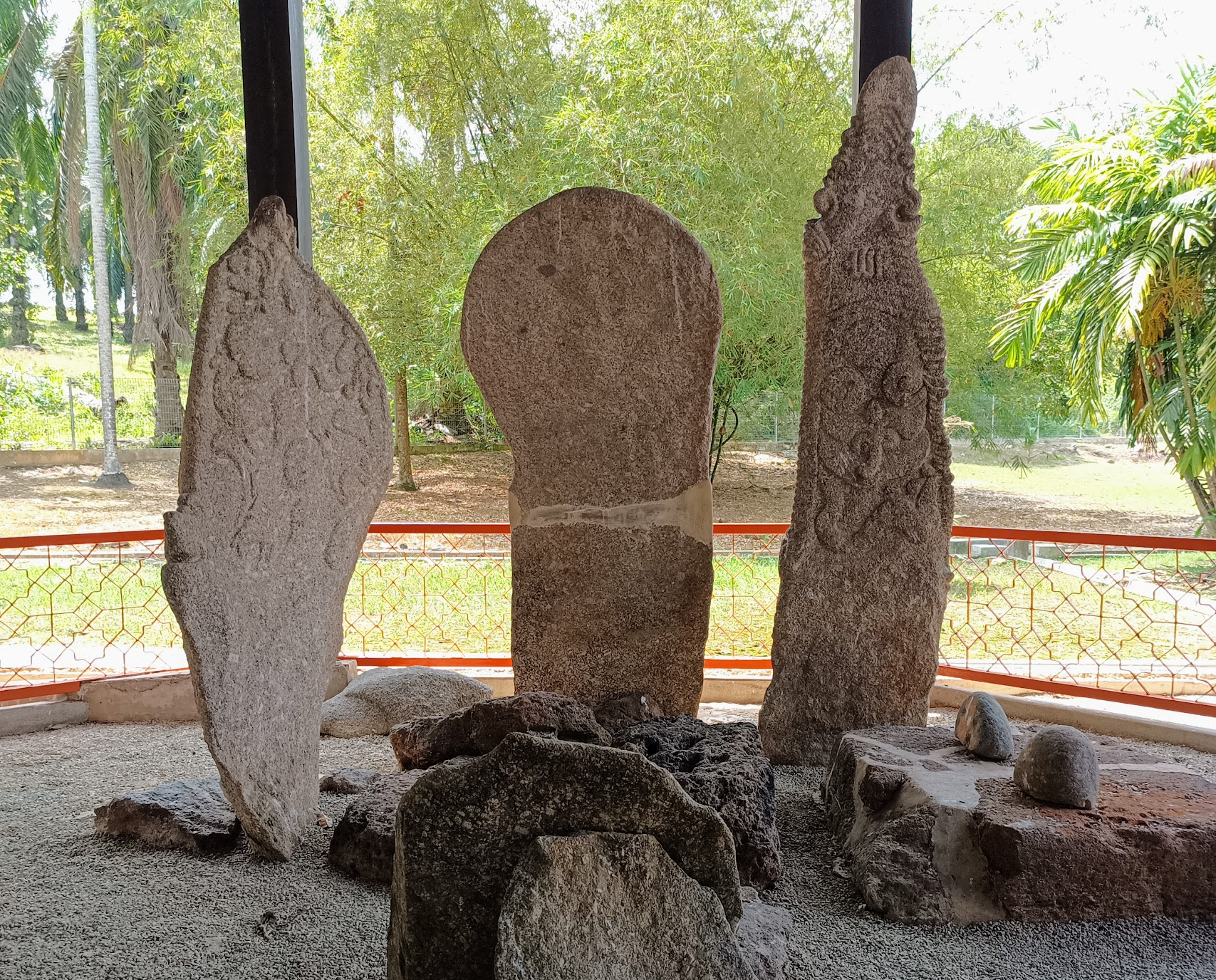
The "rudder" (left), "spoon" (middle), and "sword" (right) stones at the Pengkalan Kempas Historical Complex

The Pengkalan Kempas Historical Complex was developed on a site called Keramat Ujung Pasir (prawn river shrine). This site includes an Islamic tomb and a variety of megaliths, including the three most prominent (the "rudder", "spoon", and "sword"). The tomb is thought to be from the 15th century, while the megaliths may be many centuries older. Registered under the National Heritage Act 2005, the site is managed by the Lembaga Muzium Negeri Sembilan, and is now home to other donated megaliths, a gallery, and a surau, with proposals to further expand it to become a larger megalith museum.
