= Louis-Charles Damais =

Louis-Charles Damais (1911 in Paris – 23 May 1966 in Jakarta) was a researcher at the École française d'Extrême-Orient (EFEO). In 1937, he moved to Java, in what was then the Dutch East Indies, studying the monuments and history of the island. He remained in Java for the duration of World War II. After the war, the EFEO sent him to Hanoi, Vietnam. In 1952, he opened the Indonesian office of the EFEO in Jakarta, where he spent the rest of his life. The French international school in Jakarta was named Lycée Louis-Charles Damais after him in 2008.

== Early life and education ==
Damais was born in Paris, France.

Damais had an early passion for foreign languages, where enrolled at the National School of Oriental Languages. He showed exceptional talent and obtained six degrees: Persian, oriental Arabic, literary Arabic, Turkish, Malay, and Chinese. He also spoke Hungarian, Dutch, English, Russian, Italian, and learned Sanskrit. At the Sorbonne, Damais received various graduate certificates: Arabic studies, Indology, and history of religions. In 1935, the Fondation de Montfort awarded him a scholarship to the University of Leiden to learn Javanese and Dutch.

== Career ==
In April 1937, he went to Batavia, as project manager of the Ministry of Education and in Surakarta, where he studied dance, music and Javanese language. A musician himself, he developed a passion for gamelan and learned to play numerous instruments. He was also interested in the socio-political future of Java that later became Indonesia. Living in Java during the years of the Japanese occupation, he befriended Dr. Willem F. Stutterheim, head of the Archaeological Service in the Dutch Indies.

He returned to France in 1947, and then went to Saigon in 1949 to teach at the university. It was at this time that he joined the EFEO as general secretary: he moved to Hanoi a year before the school established a research center in Jakarta in 1952. In 1954, he participated in meetings to determine the use of neologisms in Indonesian, the official language of the young Republic.

In the 1950s, he published in BEFEO six major series of studies for Indonesia. In 1959, at the Ecole Pratique des Hautes Etudes, in the historical and philological sciences department, he created a management study of Indonesian languages and civilizations. In 1960 he published the first French translation of the letters of Kartini, with the support of UNESCO. He died suddenly in Jakarta in May 1966, leaving behind much unfinished work.

== See also ==
- Johannes Gijsbertus de Casparis
- Banjamin Walker
- Prix Stanislas Julien
- Pengkalan Kempas Historical Complex
