= I. H. N. Evans =

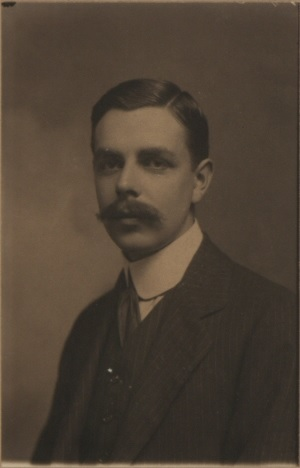
Ivor Hugh Norman Evans.

Ivor Hugh Norman Evans (1886–1957) was a British anthropologist, ethnographer and archaeologist who spent most of his working life in peninsular British Malaya (now Peninsular Malaysia) and in North Borneo (now Sabah, Malaysia).

== Life ==
Evans was educated at Charterhouse School and at Clare College, University of Cambridge, during which time he studied under Alfred Haddon. In 1910–11 he briefly served as a colonial administrator, as cadet district officer for the North Borneo Chartered Company, which administrated the independent state and British protectorate of North Borneo. He was based in the Tempasuk and Tuaran Districts.

Evans spent much of his career on peninsular Malaya from 1912 until 1932 at the Perak State Museum in Taiping, the first museum in Malaysia. He was appointed Curator there in 1917 and also worked as an ethnographer and archaeologist.

Evans took early retirement in 1932 and returned to England, settling at Oulton Broad in Suffolk. He remained there until 1938. However, he missed the East and decided to return to Borneo, where he was to spend the rest of his life. He carried out ethnographic research on the religious beliefs, practices and folklore of the Dusuns of the Kota Belud District area.

During the Japanese occupation of Borneo in World War II, Evans was held as a civilian internee at Batu Lintang camp at Kuching in Sarawak. He died in Labuan on 3 May 1957.

A collection of Evans' material, including diaries and photographs taken on peninsular Malaya and in Borneo are held at the Museum of Archaeology and Anthropology, University of Cambridge (reference GB-1638-MS. Collections, BA5/9/1-7)

Evans left a bequest to Cambridge University which led to the creation of the Evans Research Fellowship and the Evans Fund, to promote anthropological and archaeological research in South East Asia.

== Selected works ==
=== Books ===
- 1922 Among Primitive Peoples in Borneo: A Description of the Lives, Habits, and Customs of the Primitive Headhunters of North Borneo, with an Account of Interesting Objects of Prehistoric Antiquity Discovered in the Island London: Seeley, Service & Co. Limited
- 1923 Studies in Religion, Folk-Lore, and Custom in British North Borneo and the Malay Peninsula Cambridge: University Press
- 1927 Papers on the Ethnology and Archaeology of the Malay Peninsula Cambridge: University Press
- 1937 The Negritos of Malaya Cambridge: University Press
- 1953 The Religion of the Tempasuk Dusuns of North Borneo Cambridge: University Press

=== Articles ===
- 1912 "Notes on the Religious Beliefs, Superstitions, Ceremonies and Tabus of the Dusuns of the Tuaran and Tempassuk Districts, British North Borneo" The Journal of the Royal Anthropological Institute of Great Britain and Ireland 42 (July – December 1912), 380–396
- 1913 "Folk Stories of the Tempassuk and Tuaran Districts, British North Borneo" The Journal of the Royal Anthropological Institute of Great Britain and Ireland 43 (July – December 1913), 422–479
- 1917 "Malay back-slang" Journal of the Federated Malay States Museums (JFMSM) 7: 115–116
- 1917 "Notes on Some Beliefs and Customs of the 'Orang Dusun' of British North Borneo" The Journal of the Royal Anthropological Institute of Great Britain and Ireland 47 (January – June 1917), 151–159
- 1918 "Preliminary Report on Cave Exploration near Lenggong, upper Perak" JFMSM 7, 227–234
- 1918 "The Raja and the Pauper: A Borneo Folk-Tale" Man 18, (January 1918), 8–9
- 1918 "A Brass Drum from Borneo" Man 18 (February 1918), 19–20
- 1918 "Some Sakai Beliefs and Customs" The Journal of the Royal Anthropological Institute of Great Britain and Ireland 48 (July – December 1918), 179–197
- 1920 "Customs of the camphor-hunters" JFMSM 9, 53–58
- 1920 "Kempunan" Man 20 (May 1920), 69–70
- 1921 "A Grave and Megaliths in Negeri Sembilan: an Account of Some Excavations" JFMSM 9
- 1922 "Further Notes on Negrito Beliefs and Customs" JFMSM 9, 191-221
- 1922 "On an Examination of Negrito Combs from Perak" JFMSM 9, 223-226
- 1922 "The Potting Industry at Kuala Tembeling" JFMSM 9, 259 – 261
- 1922 "A Rock-Shelter at Gunung Pondok" JFMSM 11
- 1923 "Some Beliefs of the Lenggong Negritos" JFMSM 12, 17-21
- 1923 "Vaughan Stevens and the Patterns on Negrito Combs" JFMSM 12
- 1925 "An Ethnological Expedition to South Siam" JFMSM 12, 35–7
- 1925 "Further Notes on Pahang Negritos" JFMSM 12
- 1926 "Results of an Expedition to Kedah" JFMSM 12
- 1927 "Tukang Bola" JFMSM 12
- 1927 "Notes on the Remains of an Old Boat from Pontian, Pahang" JFMSM 12, 93–6
- 1927 "Further Notes on Lenggong Negritos" JFMSM 12, 101-104
- 1927 "Negrito Cave Drawings at Lenggong, Upper Perak" JFMSM 12, 105-106
- 1928 "On Ancient Remains from Kuala Selinsing, Perak" JFMSM 12(5)
- 1928 "Further Notes on Remains from Kuala Selinsing, Perak" JFMSM 12(5)
- 1928 "Further excavations at Gunung Pondok" JFMSM 12, 136–142
- 1928 "Report on cave excavations in Perak" JFMSM 12 (6), 145–60 (with Pieter V van Stein Callenfels)
- 1928 "Schebesta and the Negritos" Man 28
- 1928 "Stone Celts from Northern Burma" Man 28 (February 1928), 25–26
- 1929 "A Note on a Negrito Funeral" JFMSM 12
- 1929 "On slab-built graves in Perak" JFMSM 12, 111–120
- 1929 "Some Malay Pattern and Design" JFMSM 12, 163–167
- 1929 "A Further Note on the Kuala Selinsing Settlement" JFMSM, 12(7)
- 1929 "An Apology the Shade of Vaughan Stevens" JFMSM, 15
- 1929 "Gleanings from English Gypsies" Journal of Gypsy Lore Society New Series, 8(3), 140–142
- 1929 "Two Anglo-Romani songs" Journal of Gypsy Lore Society Third Series, 8(3), 142–143
- 1930 "Schebesta on the Sacerdo-Therapy of the Semangs" Journal of the Royal Anthropological Institute of Great Britain and Ireland 60, 115–125
- 1930 "Notes on Recent Finds at Kuala Selinsing" JFMSM, 15(1)
- 1930 "An Unusual Type of Stone Implement from British North Borneo" Man 30 (July 1930), 123–124
- 1930 "Notes on two types of stone implements from the Malay Peninsula" Man 30, 157–159
- 1931 "Excavations at Nyong, Tembeling River, Pahang" JFMSM, 15, 51–2
- 1931 "A further slab-built grave at Singkai, Perak" JFMSM 15, 63–4
- 1931 "On Some Pottery Objects from Surat" Journal of the Siam Society 24 (2), 207–209
- 1931 "Stone Objects from Surat, Peninsular Siam" Journal of the Siam Society 24 (2)
- 1932 "Excavations at Tanjong Rawa, Kuala Selinsing, Perak" JFMSM, 15(3), 79–133
- 1934 "Courtship, Marriage, and Divorce in Borneo" in Readings in the Family by Lee M. Brooks, Ernest R. Groves, and Benjamin R. Andrews Chicago: J.B. Lippincott Company
- 1955 "Bajau pottery" Sarawak Museum Journal 6 (5): 297–300

== See also ==
- Pengkalan Kempas Historical Complex

== Bibliography and sources ==
- Horton, A. V. M. (ed) Bornean Diaries 1938–1942 I. H. N. Evans Borneo Research Council Monograph 6
- King, Victor T. and Wilder, William D., The Modern Anthropology of South-East Asia: An Introduction, 47-8
- Rahman, Mohd. Kamaruzaman A., n.d., The Development of Archaeology in Malaya Online at
- Obituary of I. H. N. Evans in Sarawak Museum Journal 8 (2), 18–19
