= John Gullick =

British Orientalist

Dato' John Michael Gullick
- Born: 6 February 1916; Bristol, United Kingdom
- Died: 8 April 2012 (aged 96); Woodford Green, Greater London, United Kingdom
- Occupations: Colonial official, lawyer, academic

John Michael Gullick (6 February 1916 – 8 April 2012) was a British Orientalist who is chiefly remembered for his ground-breaking contributions to the study of pre-colonial and early colonial Malay society, Indigenous Political Systems of Western Malaya (1958), Malay Society in the Late Nineteenth Century: The Beginnings of Change (1987), and Rulers and Residents: Influence and Power in the Malay States 1870–1920 (1992).

== Biography ==
=== Early life ===
J.M. Gullick was born in Bristol in 1916. He attended Taunton School and won a scholarship to study Classics at Christ's College, Cambridge, where he excelled academically, graduating with a Double First, and athletically, serving as captain of college boats.

=== Colonial Administration Service ===
After graduating, Gullick entered the Colonial Administrative Service and was dispatched to Entebbe as the Second World War was breaking out in 1939. After serving as aide-de-camp to Sir Philip Mitchell for a short period, he was sent to Teso District as third assistant district commissioner.

In 1940, Gullick joined the King's African Rifles and participated in the Abyssinian Campaign. At the end of the campaign, he held various roles in the military administrations in Cairo, Madagascar, and Malaya, where he served for six months in the British Military Administration in the state of Negeri Sembilan.

When civilian government was restored in Malaya in 1946, Gullick was transferred to the Malayan Civil Service and served as state secretary for Negeri Sembilan. When the Federation of Malaya was formed in 1948, he joined the secretariat in Kuala Lumpur. He held various positions in the Defense and Internal Security Department, Rural and Industrial Development Authority, and the Malayanisation Committee, on which he worked closely with Onn Jaafar and Tunku Abdul Rahman.

=== Work in the rubber industry and legal career ===
In 1956, Gullick returned to England and took up a position as company secretary with The Guthrie Group, a company with concerns in rubber plantations in Malaysia. He left Guthries in 1962 and embarked on a legal career as a solicitor (he had entered Gray's Inn while on home leave in the early 1950s and qualified as a barrister and was able to transfer to be a solicitor). He joined the firm of E.F. Turner & Sons in 1963 and by 1974 had risen to senior partner. After making partner, he left the firm to lecture on company law, publishing what became the standard work on the subject for students preparing for examinations, titled Company Law.

=== Research and Publications on Malaysian history and society ===
J.M. Gullick was one of a number of British colonial administrators in Malaysia who combined an official career with significant contributions to the academic study of the history and culture of Malaysia. Other notable examples of scholar-administrators are R.O. Winstedt and Victor Purcell.

Gullick was an extremely prolific writer and continued to publish into his old age. In addition to the scholarly monographs on which his reputation rests, such as Indigenous Political Systems of Western Malaya (1958) and numerous specialist articles in journals, he also published introductions to Malaysian history intended for a general audience.

== Selected publications ==
- Gullick, J. M. (1945). Note on the election of the Undang of Jelebu.
- Gullick, J. M. (1949). Sungei Ujong. Singapore: Malaya Pub. House.
- Gullick, J. M. (1953). Captain Speedy of Larut. Singapore: Malaya Pub. House.
- Gullick, J. M. (1956). The story of early Kuala Lumpur. New York: D. Moore.
- Gullick, J. M. (1960). A history of Selangor: 1742–1957. New York: D. Moore for Eastern Universities Press.
- Gullick, J. M. (1982). Emily Innes 1843–1927. London: Royal Asiatic Society.
- Gullick, J. M. (1985). Kedah in the reign of Sultan Ahmad Tajuddin II (1854–1879). Singapore: Royal Asiatic Society.
- Gullick, J. M. (1986). Tunku Kudin in Selangor (1868–1878). Singapore: Royal Asiatic Society.
- Gullick, J. M., & Badan Warisan Malaysia. (1988). Kuala Lumpur 1880–1895: A city in the making. Selangor: Pelanduk Publications for the Heritage of Malaysia Trust.
- Gullick, J. M., & Cracknell, D. G. (1991). Company law textbook. London: HLT Publications.
- Gullick, J. M. (1991). Malay society in the late nineteenth century: The beginnings of change. Singapore: Oxford University Press.
- Gullick, J. M. (1992). They came to Malaya: A traveller's anthology. Oxford University Press.
- Gullick, J. M. (1992). Rulers and residents: Influence and power in the Malay states, 1870–1920. Oxford University Press.
- Gullick, J. M. (1995). Adventures and encounters: Europeans in South-east Asia. Kuala Lumpur: Oxford University Press.
- Gullick, J. M. (1995). Adventurous women in South-East Asia: Six lives. Kuala Lumpur: Oxford University Press.
- Gullick, J. M. (1998). Governors' houses.
- Gullick, J. M. (1999). A short history of Kuala Selangor. Kuala Lumpur: Southdene.
- Gullick, J. M. (2000). A history of Kuala Lumpur 1857–1939. Petaling Jaya, Selangor Darul Ehsan, Malaysia: Falcon Press.
- Gullick, J. M. (2003). A history of Negri Sembilan. Kuala Lumpur: Malaysian Branch of the Royal Asiatic Society.
- Gullick, J. M. (2004). A history of Selangor 1766 – 1939. Kuala Lumpur: MBRAS.
- Gullick, J. M. (2004). Indigenous political systems of western Malaya. Oxford, UK: Berg.

== Honours, decorations, awards and distinctions ==
- Fellow of the Royal Asiatic Society
- Order of Loyalty to the Crown of Malaysia – JSM (Johan Setia Mahkota)

== Bibliography ==
- Stockwell, A.J. "Obituary: J.M. Gullick, 1916–2012". Journal of the Royal Asiatic Society. III, 22 (3–4): 593–597. doi:10.1017/S1356186312000387.

== See also ==
- Pengkalan Kempas Historical Complex
