= Port Dickson District =

District in Negeri Sembilan, Malaysia

Port Dickson District Podeksen (Negeri Sembilan Malay)
- District of Negeri Sembilan
- Daerah Port Dickson
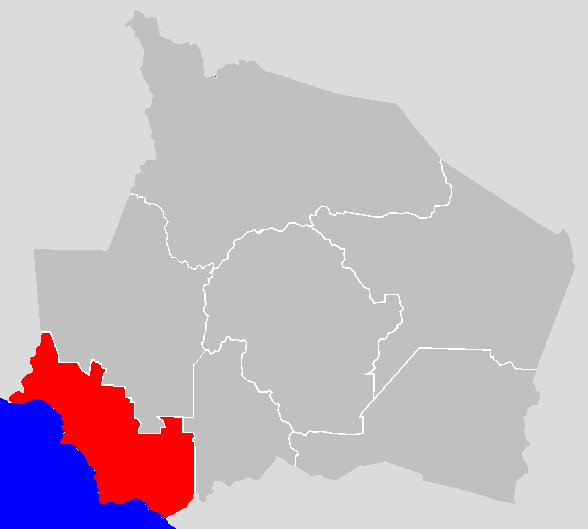
- Location of Port Dickson District in Negeri Sembilan
- Interactive map of Port Dickson District
- Location of Port Dickson District in Malaysia
- Coordinates: 2°30′N 101°55′E
- Country: Malaysia
- State: Negeri Sembilan
- Seat: Port Dickson
- Local area government(s): Port Dickson Municipal Council

Government
  - District officer: n/a

Area
  - Total: 572.35 km^{2} (220.99 sq mi)

Population (2010)
  - Total: 110,617
  - Density: 193.27/km^{2} (500.56/sq mi)
- Time zone: UTC+8 (MST)
  - Summer (DST): UTC+8 (Not observed)
- Postcode: 71000 (Port Dickson Town); 71010 (Lukut); 71050 (Si Rusa); 71100 (Siliau); 71150 (Linggi, Pengkalan Kempas); 71250 (Pasir Panjang); 71960 (Chuah, Bukit Pelandok)
- Calling code: +6-06
- Vehicle registration plates: N

Port Dickson District (Negeri Sembilan Malay: Podeksen) is a district in Negeri Sembilan, Malaysia. It is the only coastal district in Negeri Sembilan. The district borders Sepang District, Selangor to the north, the Strait of Malacca to the west, Seremban District to the northeast, Rembau District to the east, and Alor Gajah District, Malacca to the south. It also surrounds Tanjung Tuan, an exclave of Malacca under the jurisdiction of Alor Gajah District, to its southwest.

== Administrative divisions ==

Port Dickson District is divided into 5 mukims, which are:

- Jimah
- Linggi
- Pasir Panjang
- Port Dickson Town
- Si Rusa

== Townships in Port Dickson District ==
1. Port Dickson
2. Bandar Springhill
3. Bandar Sunggala
4. Bukit Palong
5. Jimah
6. Kuala Lukut
7. Linggi
8. Lukut
9. Pasir Panjang
10. Pengkalan Kempas
11. Si Rusa
12. Teluk Kemang

== Demographics ==
Historical population
Year	Pop.	±%
1991	92,171	—
2000	106,630	+15.7%
2010	110,991	+4.1%
2020	128,657	+15.9%

== Federal Parliament and State Assembly Seats ==
List of Port Dickson district representatives in the Federal Parliament (Dewan Rakyat)

Parliament	Seat Name	Member of Parliament	Party
P132	Port Dickson	Aminuddin Harun	Pakatan Harapan (PKR)

List of Port Dickson district representatives in the State Legislative Assembly (Dewan Undangan Negeri)

Parliament	State	Seat Name	State Assemblyman	Party
P132	N29	Chuah	Yew Boon Lye	Pakatan Harapan (PKR)
P132	N30	Lukut	Choo Ken Hwa	Pakatan Harapan (DAP)
P132	N31	Bagan Pinang	Abdul Fatah Zakaria	Perikatan Nasional (PAS)
P132	N32	Linggi	Mohd Faizal Ramli	Barisan Nasional (UMNO)
P132	N33	Sri Tanjung	Rajasekaran Gunnasekaran	Pakatan Harapan (PKR)
