= Johannes Gijsbertus de Casparis =

Dutch indologist

Johannes Gijsbertus de Casparis (31 May 1916, Eemnes – 19 June 2002, Wassenaar) was a Dutch orientalist and indologist.

== Early years ==
After attending Barlaeus Gymnasium in Amsterdam, De Casparis started piano study at the conservatory of Amsterdam. However, a year later, in 1934, he turned to classical languages with Russian as a minor at the University of Amsterdam. Barend Faddegon was teaching Sanskrit in Amsterdam and under his influence, de Casparis switched to Sanskrit. In 1935, the archaeologist Willem Frederik Stutterheim of the Oudheidkundige Dienst in Nederlandsch-Indië (Archaeological Service in the Netherlands Indies) gave a lecture at the University of Amsterdam at which time he advised de Casparis to transfer to Leiden to continue his studies because the Oudheidkundige Dienst was looking for an epigrapher to replace Roelof Goris. Accordingly, de Casparis registered for Indology at the University of Leiden in 1936. He excelled as a student and quickly passed his examinations in Sanskrit (with Jean Philippe Vogel), Avestan (with J. H. Kramers), archaeology and ancient history (with N. J. Krom), Old Javanese (with Cornelis Christiaan Berg), and Malay (with Ph. S. van Ronkel). Moreover, he forged lifelong friendship with Raghu Vira, Durga Prashad Pandey and Senarath Paranavitana. de Casparis was appointed as Vogel's assistant and in 1939, at the age of 23, graduated. His thesis presented a new interpretation of the Sanskrit inscription of Dinoyo of CE 760.

== Indonesia and the Second World War ==
On 3 August 1939 De Casparis was appointed epigrapher to the Oudheidkundige Dienst in Batavia. Arriving at the Netherlands Indies, De Casparis was welcomed by Stutterheim and with him toured through Central Java and East Java. After ten months at the Oudheidkundige Dienst in Batavia, however, his position was abruptly terminated. With the imperial Japanese threat, he was called up on 2 July 1940 to serve as a cryptographer in the Dutch colonial army (KNIL) and in the same year Louis-Charles Damais succeeded him as acting epigrapher. In early 1942, the Japanese invaded the Indonesian archipelago and De Casparis was taken prisoner, labouring on the Burmese railway. Together with H. R. van Heekeren, P. Voorhoeve, Chris Hooykaas, his close friend the Sinologist Marius van der Valk, and the Dutch entertainer Wim Kan, he survived the labour camps. By the end of the war De Casparis was fluent in Japanese. For a year after the Japanese surrender, he travelled through Thailand and visited archaeological sites. He stayed in Kanchanaburi, and learned Thai, and studied the inscriptions of Ram Kamhaeng. In August 1946, De Casparis returned to the Netherlands as a second lieutenant in the air force. At this time, some seven years after first meeting his future wife in France while en route to Batativa, he married Gisèle Marie Fongaro, an Italian-born Frenchwoman.

== Return to Indonesia ==
The Renville Agreement paved the way for de Casparis's return to the archipelago in 1948 and a year later, his wife and young daughter Anna (born 1947) followed him to Jakarta. Damais was reappointed acting epigrapher in 1945, but in September 1947 he returned to France. As of November 1947, August Johan Bernet Kempers headed the Oudheidkundige Dienst and on 17 April 1948, De Casparis again took up his post as epigrapher. On 14 November he defended his PhD thesis on the inscriptions from the Śailendra period at the University of Indonesia in Jakarta. Politically committed to Indonesia's struggle for independence, De Casparis met Sukarno, who showed an interest in archaeology and had established an independent Republican archaeological service (Dinas Purbakala) in Yogyakarta. In 1950, this replaced the Oudheidkundige Dienst. Meanwhile, the Oudheidkundige Dienst had started training Indonesians; R. Soekmono studied with Bernet Kempers who promptly made Soekmono his successor in 1953 after the latter's graduation. Boechari became de Casparis's student in epigraphy. In 1955, de Casparis became professor in the early history of Indonesia and Sanskrit at a branch of Airlangga University (Surabaya) in Malang. In the same year he also gave courses as visiting professor of the history of South and Southeast Asia at Universitas Adityawarman, founded by Mohammad Yamin in Batusangkar, Sumatra. Because of these duties de Casparis stayed in Jakarta for another year before moving to Malang with his family.

== Return to Europe ==
Anti-Dutch sentiment in Indonesia was mounting and although de Casparis would have liked to become an Indonesian national, for the sake of the education of his three daughters, Anna, Françoise (born 1950), and Claire (born 1952), the family decided to return to Europe in 1958 when he was offered a position as lecturer in the early history of South and Southeast Asia at SOAS. He was promoted to reader in 1961. At SOAS, De Casparis worked with Chris Hooykaas, reader in Old Javanese, on the textual comparison between the Sanskrit Bhattikavya and the Old Javanese Kakawin Ramayana.

In 1978 De Casparis returned to Leiden to become professor of the early history and archaeology of South and Southeast Asia at the Department of Languages and Cultures of South and Central Asia (Kern Institute). After 39 years away from the Netherlands, and with a family that did not speak Dutch, he did not feel entirely at home in the formal setting of Dutch academia. Nonetheless his Leiden period was fruitful in terms of publications and the number of students he produced. During his London period, De Casparis had been invited by the University of Hawaii as visiting professor and in 1983 returned to Hawaii to occupy the Burns Chair of History while retaining his Leiden post. After his retirement in 1986 at the age of 70, De Casparis remained active and exercised his right to supervise PhD dissertations to 1991. Many of his students were from Sri Lanka, and this led to his being awarded a Doctor of Letters, honoris causa, by the University of Peradeniya on 22 December 1990. He remained active after his wife died in 1998 and had hoped, in 2000, to return to Indonesia to study the inscriptions at Wadu Paa. He was unable to make the trip, but continued, nonetheless, to work on the inscriptions of Siṇḍok until his death in 2002.

De Casparis was a corresponding member of the Royal Netherlands Academy of Arts and Sciences from 1957 until 1979, when he resigned.

== Key Publications ==
- L'Importance de la disyllabie en Javanais, (1947)
- Prasasti Indonesia I: Inscripties uit de Çailendra-tijd, (1950)
- Twintig jaar studie van de oudere geschiedenis van Indonesia (1931-1951), (1954)
- Prasasti Indonesia II: Selected Inscriptions from the 7th to the 9th century A.D., (1956)
- Short inscriptions from Tjaṇḍi Plaosan-lor, (1958)
- Historical writing on Indonesia, (1961)
- Indonesian palaeography: a history of writing in Indonesia from the beginnings to C. A, Part 1500, (1975)
- Peranan Adityawarman Putera Melayu di Asia Tenggara, (1989)
- An ancient garden in West Sumatra, (1990)

== See also ==
- Lijst van Indonesiëkundigen or List of Scholars connected with Indonesia, in Dutch
- Pengkalan Kempas Historical Complex
