= Linggi =

- Mukim
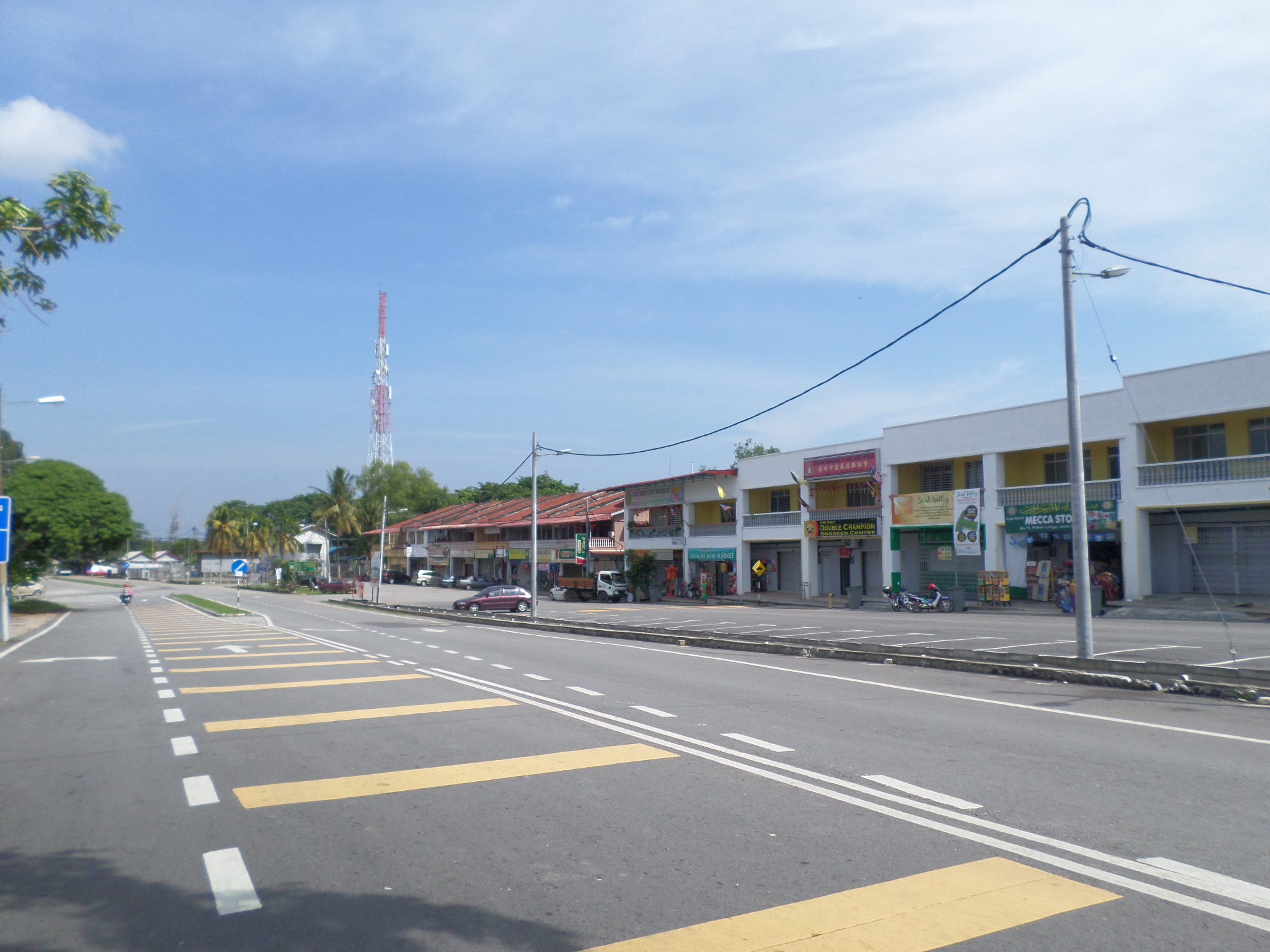
- Linggi town centre, on the intersection between State Route N7 (foreground) and Federal Route 5 (background) facing north.
- Interactive map of Linggi
- Coordinates: 2°29′N 102°01′E
- Country: Malaysia
- State: Negeri Sembilan
- District: Port Dickson
- Luak: Linggi

Government
  - Body: Port Dickson Municipal Council
  - President: Hasnor Abdul Hamid
  - MP: Aminuddin Harun (PH–PKR)
  - MLA: Mohd Faizal Ramli (BN–UMNO)
- Postcode: 71150

Linggi
- Luak Beradat
- Luak Linggi
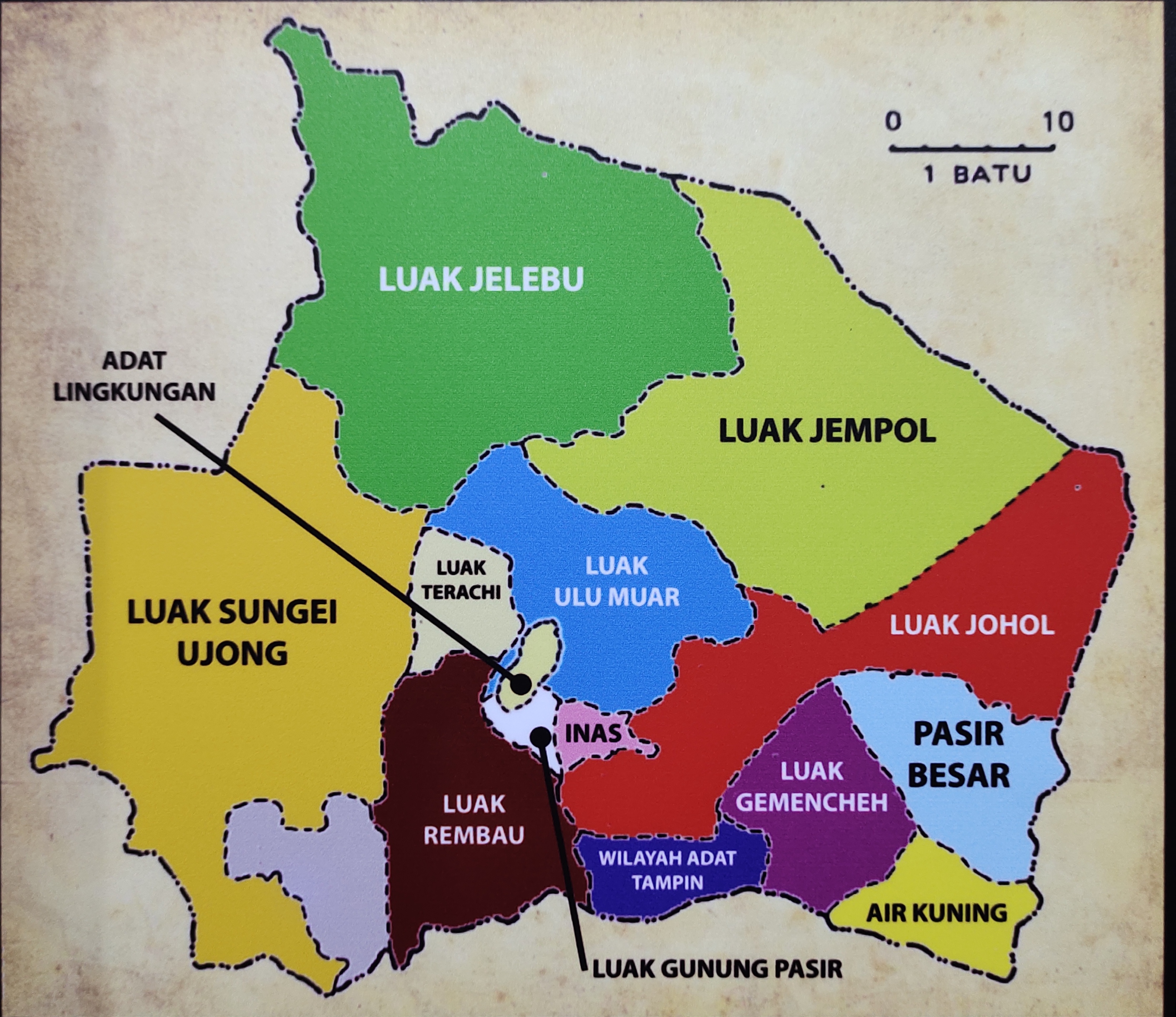
- Luak of Linggi (unnamed) relative to other luaks in Negeri Sembilan
- Country: Malaysia
- State: Negeri Sembilan
- Adat institution: Undang of Sungai Ujong

Government
  - Dato' Muda Linggi: Amran Mohd. Salleh

Linggi is a mukim and town in Port Dickson District, Negeri Sembilan, Malaysia.
