= Lukut Fort and Museum =

- Kota dan Muzium Lukut
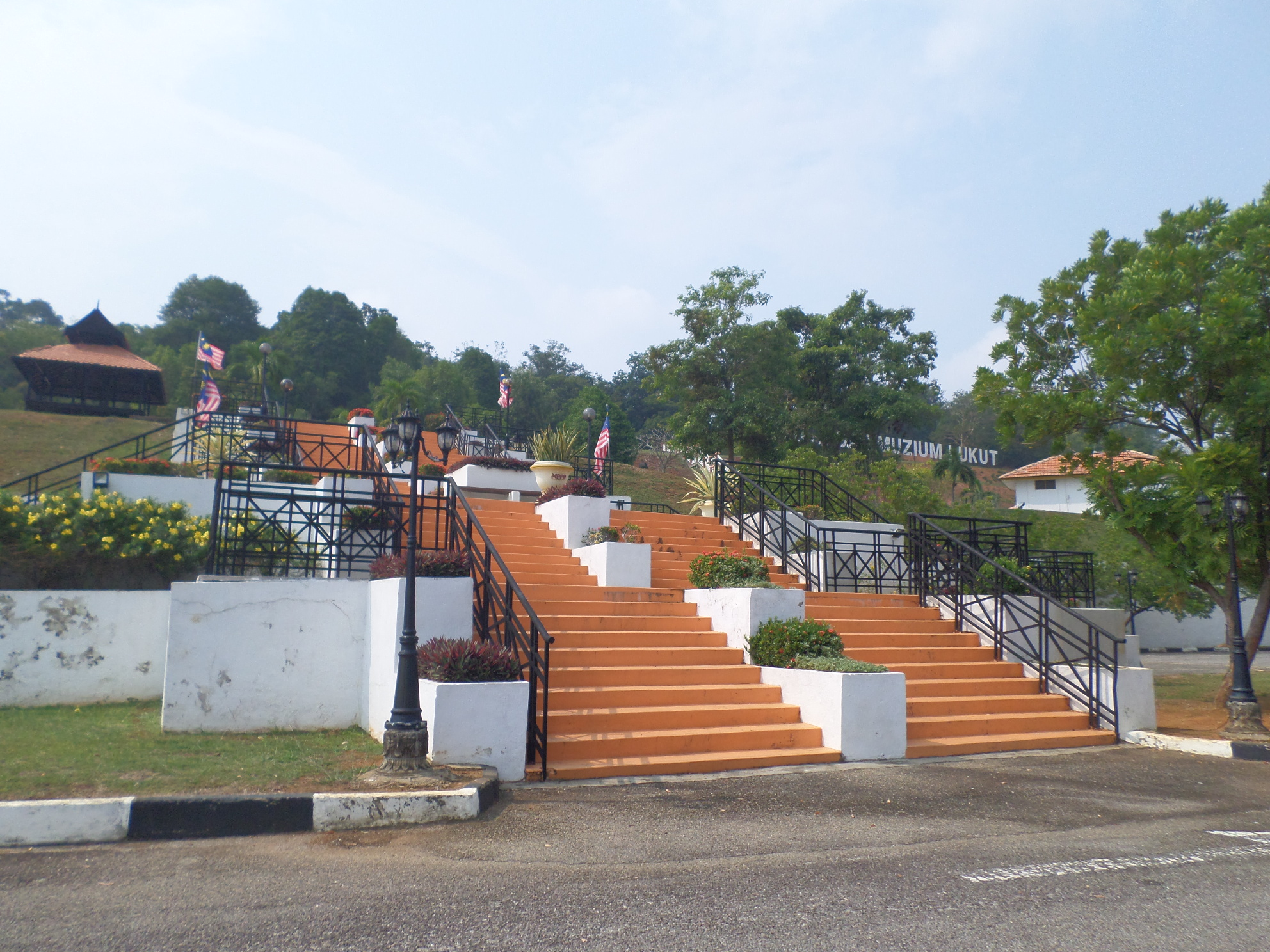
- Lukut Museum and Fort
- Established: 1847 (fortress); 9 April 1999 (museum)
- Location: Lukut
- Coordinates: 2.567°N 101.822°E
- Type: Fortress remnants and museum
- Visitors: Local and foreigners

The Lukut Fort and Museum (Malay: Kota dan Muzium Lukut) is a historical site in Lukut, Port Dickson, Negeri Sembilan, Malaysia. The fort was built by Raja Jumaat in 1847 and later controlled by his son Raja Bot. Located on a hill, it is in ruins and the area has been converted into a historic recreation park above the museum. The museum houses some of the antiquities of the fort, apart from artefacts and pictures related to the history of the past tin extraction done in Lukut area.

== Location ==
The fort is located on Bukit Mati or Bukit Gajah Mati (Malay: "Dead Elephant Hill") above the town of Lukut; the hill is several hundred meters high. The museum is located at the foot of the hill in Lukut, which is around 6 kilometres (3.7 mi) to the north of the port town of Port Dickson.

== History ==
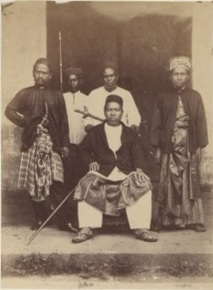
Rajah Böt of Lukut & his two brothers.

The fort was built by Bugis warrior Raja Jumaat in 1847 as a strong fortification to control his trading in tin which was his monopoly operated from the town of Lukut. When disputes arose on the control of the fort and the Lukut area which was with the bordering state of Selangor till the 1870s, it was then ceded to the Luak of Sungai Ujong — which later formed the present day state of Negeri Sembilan — under border treaty negotiations held between the two kingdoms in 1880. After Jumaat's death his son Raja Bot (the ruler of Lukut district) controlled the large fort. The museum has been gazetted as a historical monument under the jurisdiction of the Department of Museums Malaysia.

== Features ==
The Lukut Fort is on the hill above the museum.

=== Lukut fort ===
The fort, also known as Kota Lukut, is now in ruins except for a few mud walls made of laterite and moats of 5 metres (16 ft) depth. The fort area is now developed under the government policy of the Ministry of Culture, Arts and Tourism into a historic recreational park area built with gazebos and control towers. Large muzzle loading guns had been mounted on the fort. The small cannons which were also mounted on the Lukut fort have been removed to the museum.

=== Lukut museum ===
The museum was established by the Department of Museums and Antiquities (now the Department of Museums Malaysia) in association with the Government of Negeri Sembilan to provide historical information about the history and culture of the 19th century in the Lukut area. It was inaugurated on 9 April 1999. The museum, at the foot of the hill in Lukut town, is a double-storied building. It has four display sections which bring out the history of Lukut (of its past mining days) in particular, and also history of Negeri Sembilan. The exhibits relating to the history of Lukut is traced from the early nineteenth century to the time of its cession to the district of Sungai Ujong (Negeri Sembilan) in 1880; the historical rulers covered in the museum are Raja Busu, Raja Jaafar, Raja Jumaat and Raja Bot who contributed to the economic prosperity of the region. Traditional culture of the community, and the customs and traditions of the practice of Adat Perpatih (rules of life), typical to the state, are displayed. The artefacts include the antiquities from the Dutch VOC warship Nassau that was sunk in the Battle of Cape Rachado, off the coast of Port Dickson in 1606.

== See also ==
- List of museums in Malaysia

== Bibliography ==
- Centre, SEAMEO Project in Archaeology and Fine Arts. Library and Documentation (1986). Historical and Archaeological Sites and Monuments of Southeast Asia: Malaysia, the Philippines, Singapore. SPAFA Library and Documentation Centre. ISBN 9789747809138.
- Cook, Debbie (1994). Malaysia, Land of Eternal Summer. Wilmette Publications. ISBN 978-983-99908-0-5.
- Jaaffar, Johan; Hussain, Safian; Ahmad, Mohd. Thani (1992). History of modern Malay literature. Dewan Bahasa dan Pustaka, Ministry of Education, Malaysia. ISBN 978-983-62-2745-4.
- Peet, George L. (1983). A Journal in the Federal Capital. Council of the Malaysian Branch of the Royal Asiatic Society. ISBN 978-9971-65-120-6.
- Pelancongan, Malaysia, Kementerian Kebudayaan, Kesenian dan (2002). Directory of museums in Malaysia. Ministry of Culture, Arts and Tourism, Malaysia. ISBN 978-967-9935-11-0.
- Richmond, Simon; Harper, Damian (December 2006). Malaysia, Singapore & Brunei. Ediz. Inglese. Lonely Planet. ISBN 978-1-74059-708-1.
