= Lukut =

- Suburb of Port Dickson
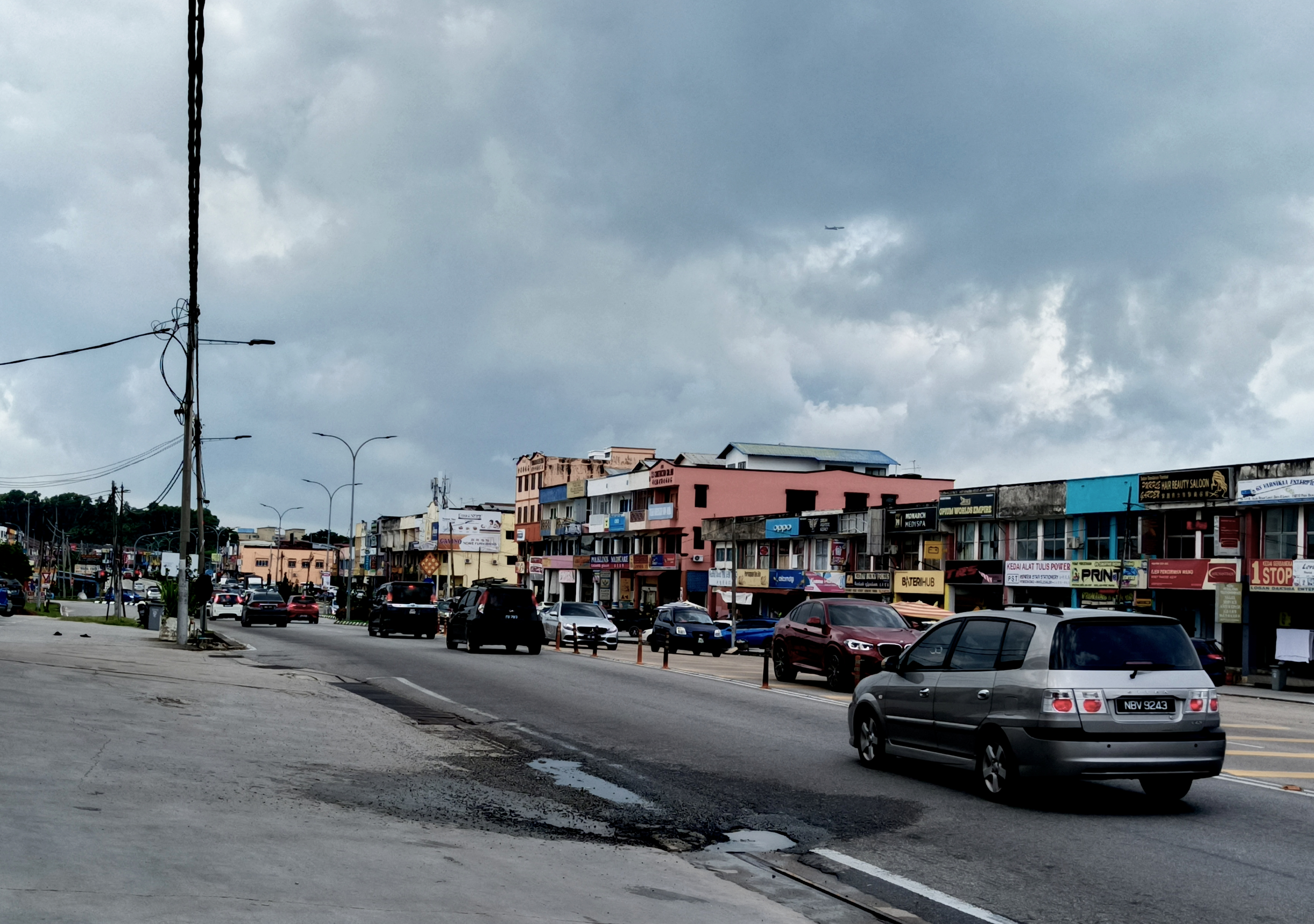
- Downtown Lukut
- Interactive map of Lukut
- Coordinates: 2°34′N 101°50′E
- Country: Malaysia
- State: Negeri Sembilan
- District: Port Dickson
- Luak: Sungai Ujong
- Founded: 1800s (as fief of Selangor)
- Ceded: 1880

Government
  - Local Authority: Majlis Perbandaran Port Dickson
  - Federal Constituency: Port Dickson
  - MP: Aminuddin Harun
  - State Constituency: Lukut
  - MLA: Choo Ken Hwa

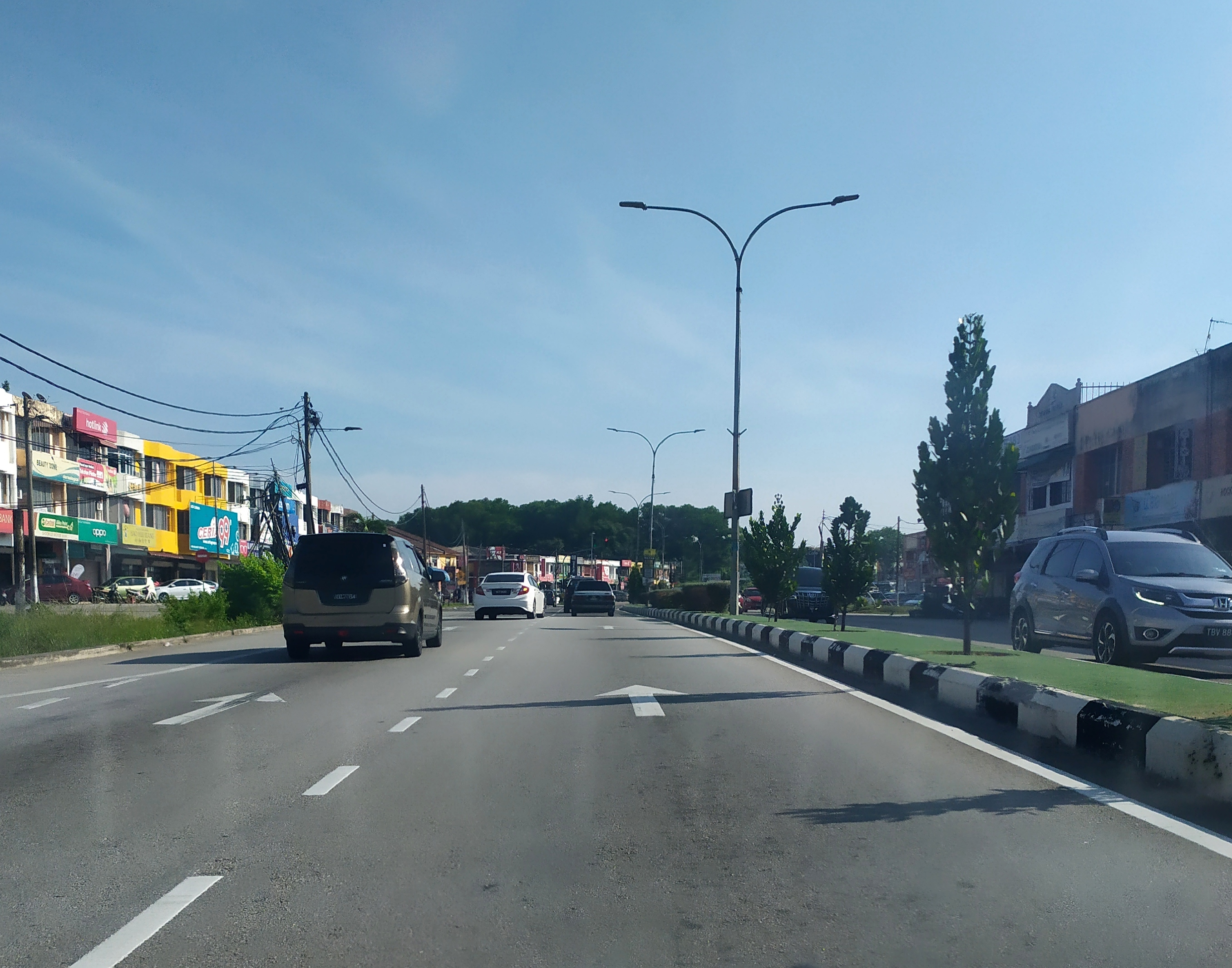
Federal Routes 5 and 53 (overlapped, southbound and westbound) passes through Lukut

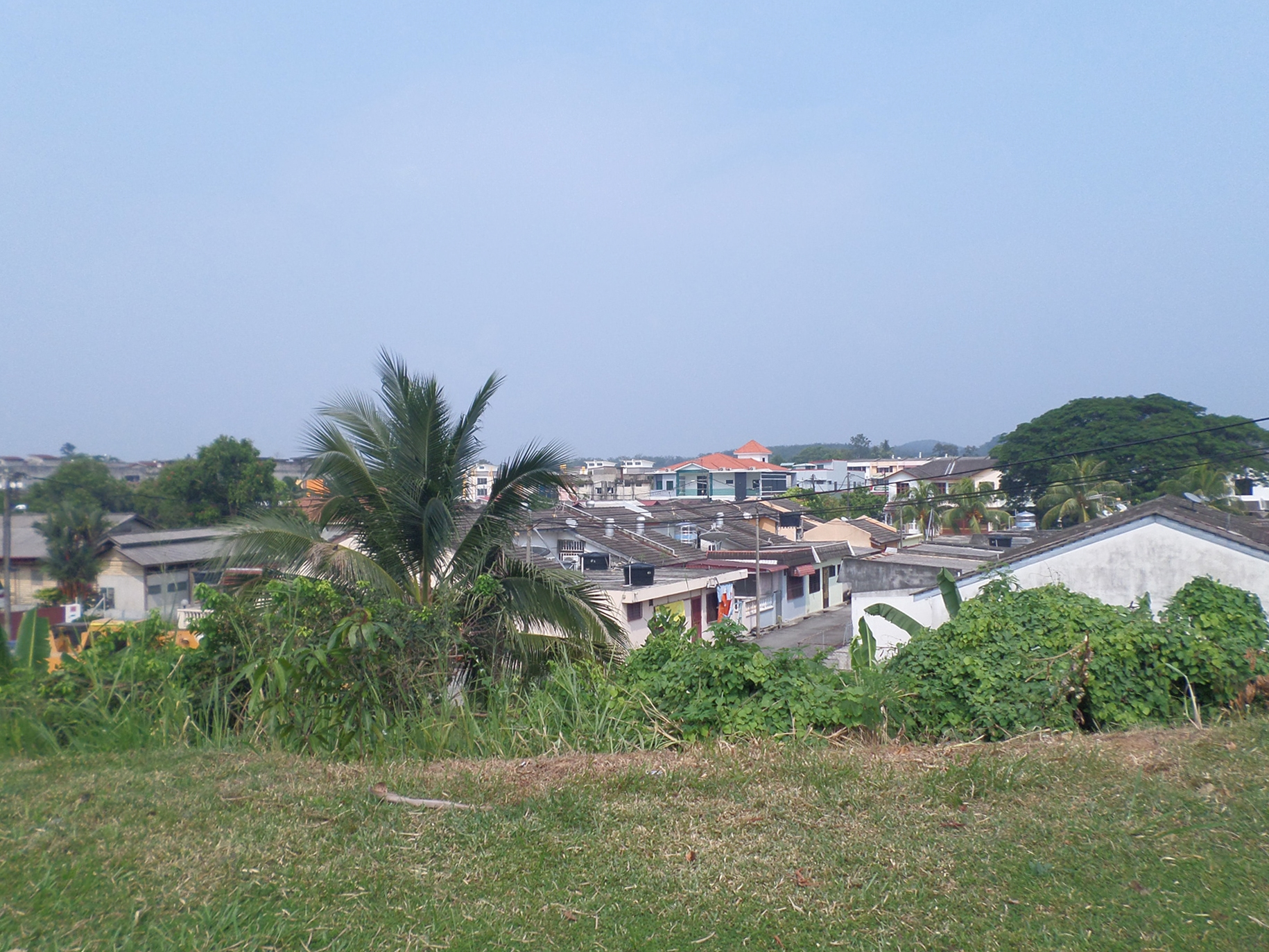
A residential area in Lukut

Lukut in Port District District

Lukut is a suburb located to the northeast of Port Dickson, Negeri Sembilan, Malaysia.

It was once part of Selangor, serving as a thriving tin mining town in the early 19th-century before being ceded to Sungai Ujong domain in 1880 to which formed part of the modern borders of Negeri Sembilan.

== History ==
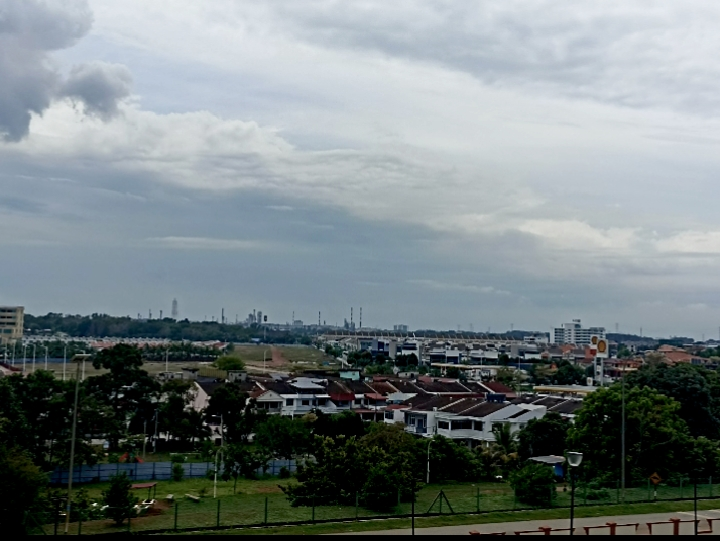
Skyline of Lukut seen from the slopes of Bukit Gajah Mati, where the remnants of a fortress is located

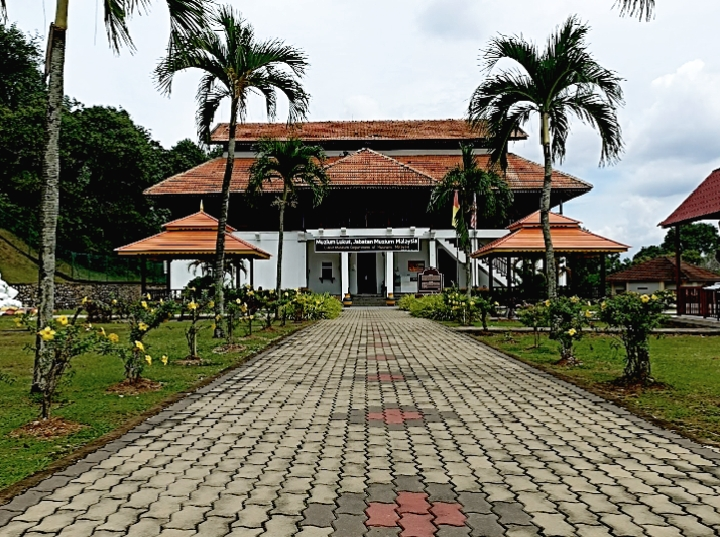
Lukut Museum, part of the Lukut Fort and Museum complex

In the early 18th century, Chinese miners from Malacca had been allowed by Sultan Ibrahim Shah, the ruler of Selangor to mine this area. Sultan Ibrahim signed a trade agreement with the East India Company based in Penang which caused tin from the Lukut mines to be lucrative to the Selangor Crown. This directly caused an uptick in population numbers, particularly from the Hainanese Chinese community which made the Sultan have to appoint a Kapitan to be the representative of the Chinese people.

=== Lukut under Raja Busu ===
They need to manage the area caused Sultan Ibrahim to grant Lukut to his nephew Raja Hassan, also known as Raja Busu as his fief. He brought along Malay followers to settle the land with him. Raja Busu had introduced some civil and economic laws such as having to ask for his permission before working on any land. The number of residents was 1000 people in 1824 and continued to increase in the next 10 years.

As a result, businesses were erected to serve the Chinese miners such as opium dens, brothels from Singapore and food supply from the Malays. However, Raja Busu also charged a high tax rate of 10% for every tin deposit that passed through Lukut. This caused dissatisfaction among the mine owners who came to negotiate with him one day in 1834. Raja Busu reportedly refused to leave his residence and the "sight of deposits everywhere" further embroiled the 400 Chinese people who were there. They resorted to burn his residence, killing him and his family.

Raja Husin of Riau, a relative of both the Sultan and Raja Busu heard of this incident and brought a force to take revenge and massacre around 1000 Chinese miners. This caused them to flee and Lukut to be abandoned.

=== Lukut under Raja Jaafar and Raja Jum'aat ===
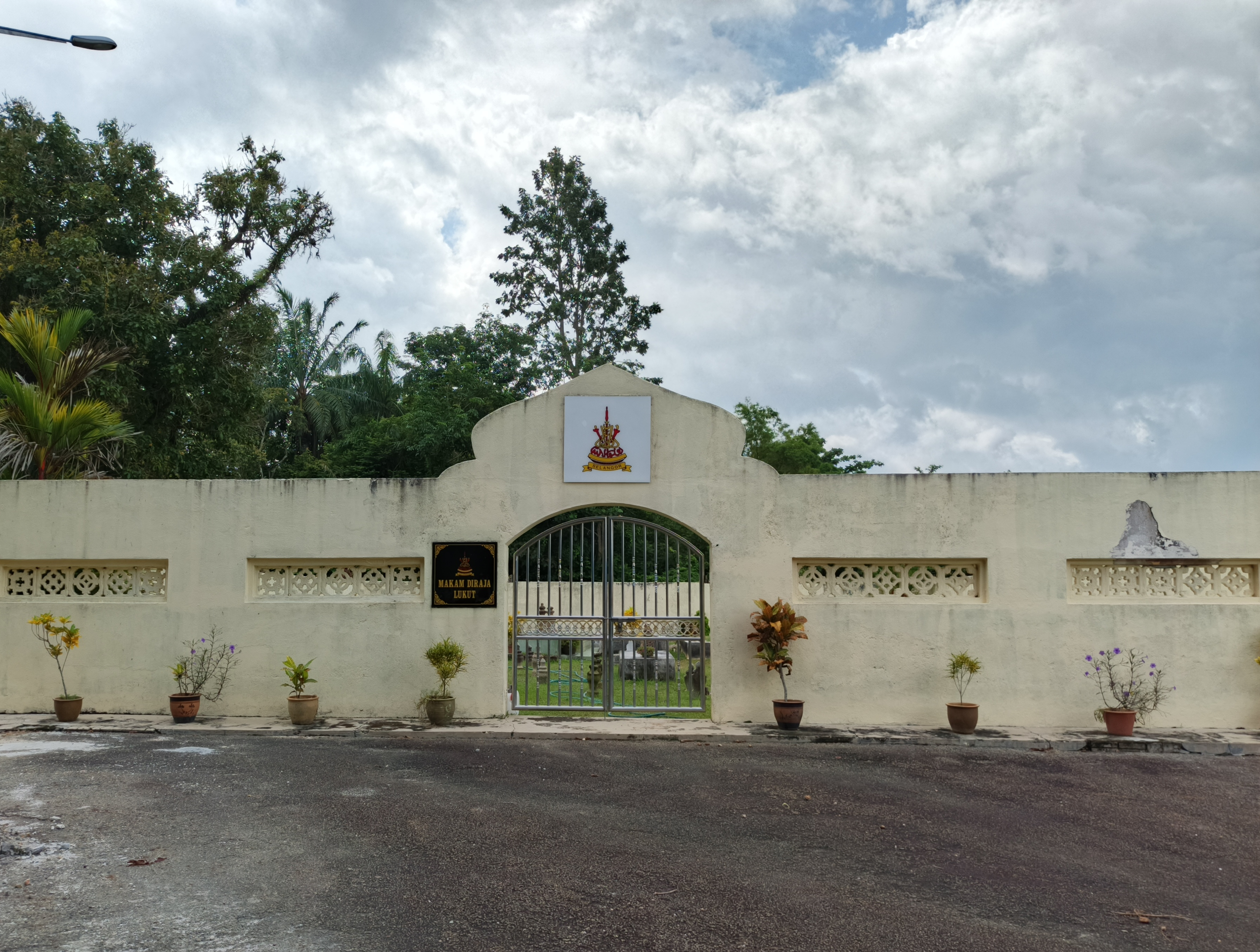
The Selangor Royal Mausoleum complex in downtown Lukut

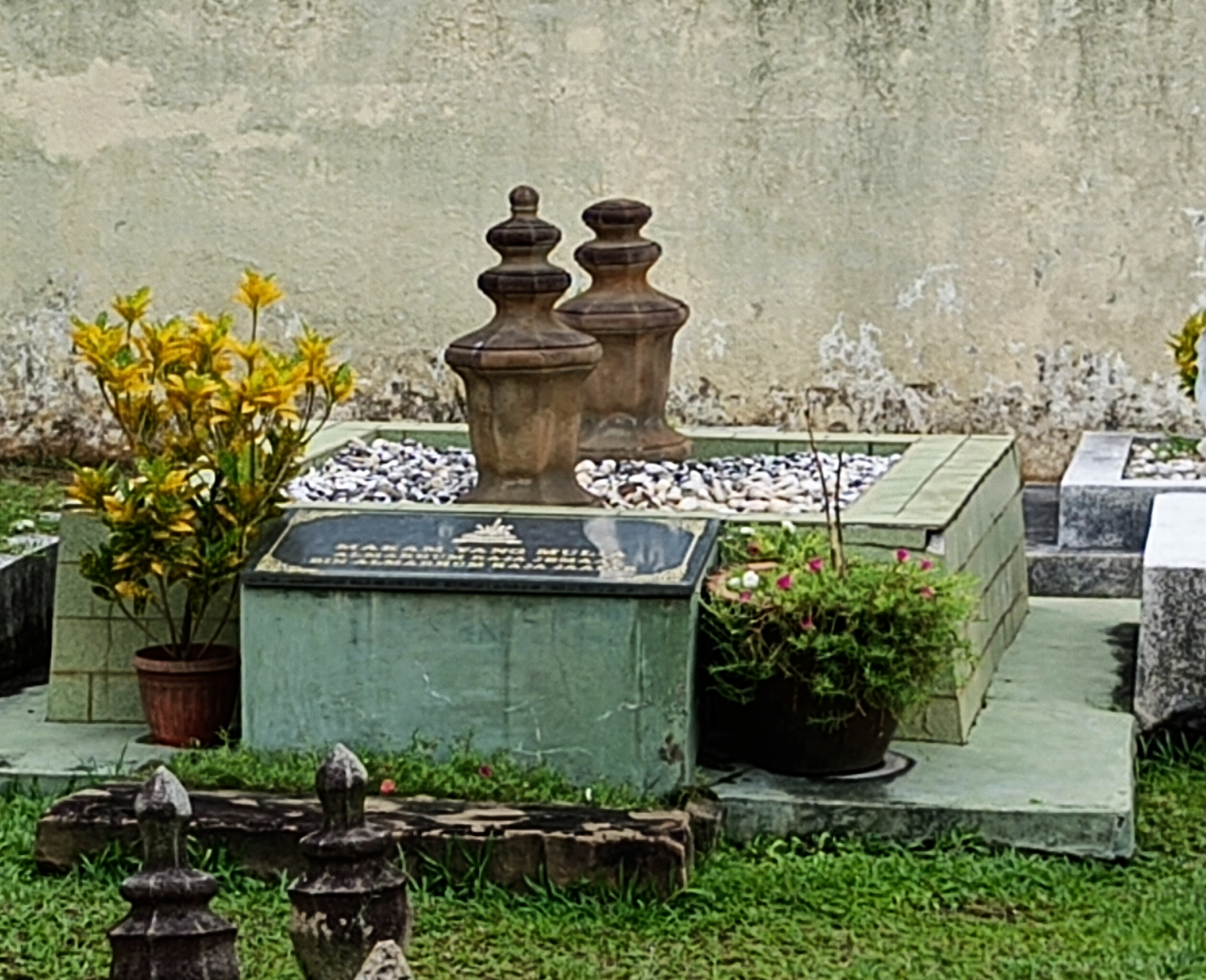
Grave of Raja Jum'aat inside the Selangor Royal Mausoleum, Lukut

In 1835, Raja Jaafar Raja Ali, a noble of the house of Bugis-Riau received permission from Sultan Muhammad Shah, the new ruler of Selangor - and his third cousin - to operate a tin mining business in Lukut. Hearing of the mine's newfound success, the Sultan personally visited Lukut and declared that it was to be part of Selangor, thus rendering its relative independence obsolete. The Sultan's seal of approval caused Malays to return to the area. The Sultan's further assurance to Chinese investors in the Straits' Settlements caused an increase in capital and labour in Lukut.

After his father's death in 1846, Raja Jum'aat succeeded in his place as leader of the tin mining operation. His good standing with the Sultan, even going so far as to settle his outstanding debts with European and Chinese merchants in the Straits Settlements as well as marrying the Sultan's daughter Tengku Nai allowed Raja Jum'aat to be granted Lukut as his fief. Under his reign, Lukut rose to prominence, even being classified as a town. This was due to Raja Jum'aat's ability to appeal to the owners of the mine as well as being able to ensure security for those under his watch. The tax rate was lowered from 20%, a rate determined in part due to the tendency of Straits' Settlement merchants to deal directly with mine owners rather than local rulers, to 10% after meeting with said mine owners. A customs house was established to ensure the fair execution of this order. In addition, like Raja Busu, permission was required to set up any venture on Lukut land. He also expanded the territory of Lukut to be from the Sepang river to the Linggi River.

The Chinese were heavily involved in the improvement of Lukut as many of those with ability had learned those skills from their time in Malacca. Thus, people like Chee Yam Chuan, Hin Siew and Yap Si invested money into building the town. Yam Chuan also took Raja Jum'aat's son Raja Bot under his wing as a business protégé. A young Yap Ah Loy also worked here in the mines of Chong Chong for three years before gaining enough capital to start his own business.

Besides that, roads were built with prisoner labour in order to further the reach of Lukut and were plied by carts pulled by oxen. A police force consisting of Malays was established to keep order as many of the mines had kongsi ties, particularly to the rival Ghee Hin and Hai San factions. A fort was erected on Bukit Gajah Mati to serve as both residences of Raja Jum'aat and as a strategic vantage point that could be used to, equipped with cannons and a moat.

Raja Juma'at died in 1864.

=== Decline and cession of Lukut ===
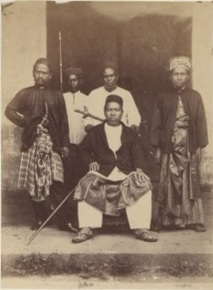
Raja Bot and his assistants

The death of Raja Jum'aat had further-reaching implications as he was one of the most powerful chiefs of Selangor. Thus, on the succession of his son Raja Bot, the outbreak of the Selangor Civil War was imminent. Raja Bot was assisted by his brother Raja Yahya in running Lukut. He also hired 30 Arabs to help in the town's defence, some of whom mingled with the locals and produced mixed offspring. By the time of Raja Bot's ascension, other mines had managed to grow in Selangor including Kanching, Kuala Lumpur and Ampang. This competition coupled with the depletion of tin in the mines caused losses which made the Chinese miners moved Northwards to these competitors. The role of Lukut as a mining town thus became obsolete, with only 300 people remaining in the 1870s. Thus, the mining pool was flooded due to lack of use and its infrastructure was abandoned.

Furthermore, Lukut was involved in skirmishes resulting from the unrest in its neighbouring territories. The Raja of Sungai Raya, Sulaiman attempted to gain independence from Lukut but failed and was defeated, the battle causing Raja Bot's Arab troops to flee. Lukut was also disturbed by Yahya, an adopted child of the Langat ruler as he murdered a Chinese resident of Lukut in front of Raja Bot. Raja Bot thus approved of retaliatory attacks on non-Lukut Malays which caused a battle to ensue which resulted in Yahya fleeing with Raja Bot's relative Raja Laut.

A British fleet captained by Major Anson of the 2nd Battalion of the Buffs requested assistance from Raja Bot in the Sungei Ujong War which was met with a refusal to engage but freedom of passage. As a result of the Sungei Ujong War, Lukut was ceded to Sungei Ujong in July 1880, which soon became Negeri Sembilan's territory, thus spelling the end of Raja Bot's rule. The town has since been included in Port Dickson region of Negeri Sembilan.

== Economy ==
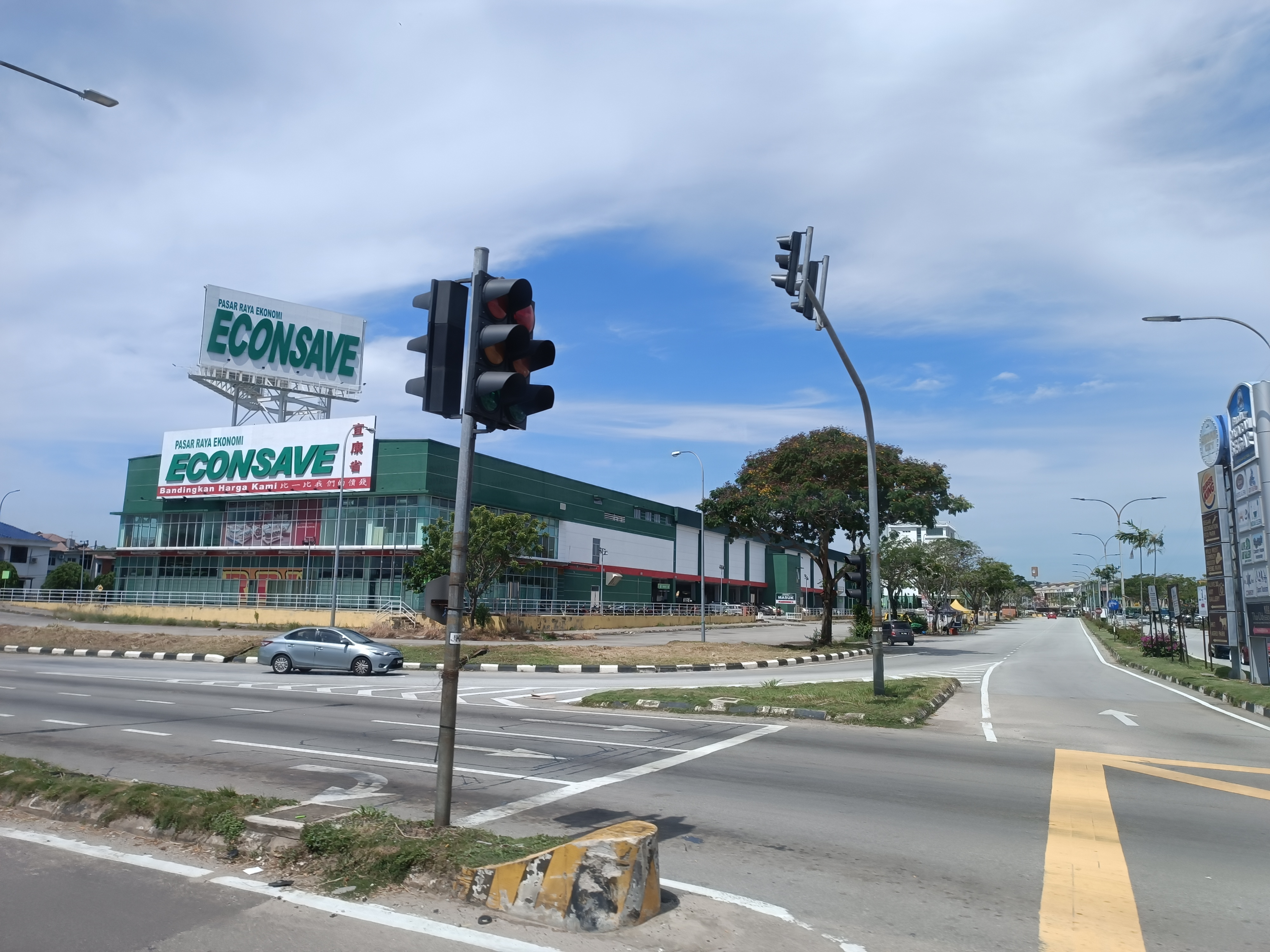
Econsave, previously a Giant supermarket in Lukut

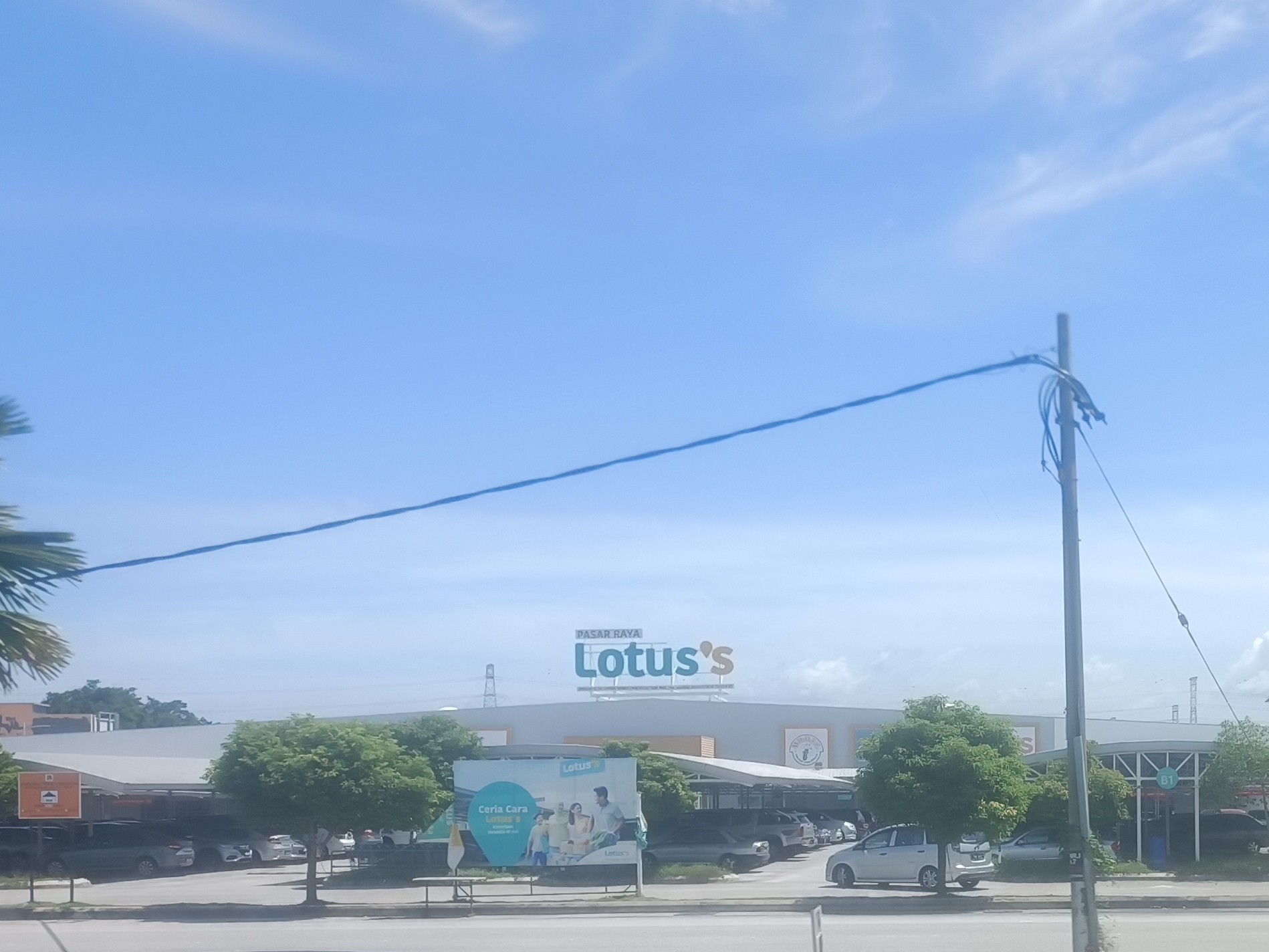
Lotus's, previously a Tesco in Lukut

Lukut is also famous for its Bird's Nest (Swiftlet Nest) industry. It is a traditional natural healthy food as most Chinese believed. One of the famous brands is Hutanis Bird's Nest which originates from the town. The Lukut Fort and Museum also serves as a cultural heritage centre.

== Politics ==
Lukut is under the purview of the Port Dickson Municipal Council (Majlis Perbandaran Port Dickson). Federally it is part of the Port Dickson (formerly Telok Kemang) parliamentary constituency. The current MP is Aminuddin Harun, the former Menteri Besar of Negeri Sembilan.

In the State Legislative Assembly, it is part of the Lukut state constituency. The current Member of the Legislative Assembly is Choo Ken Hwa of DAP.
